Vayeira, Vayera, or  ( — Hebrew for "and He appeared," the first word in the parashah) is the fourth weekly Torah portion (parashah) in the annual Jewish cycle of Torah reading. It constitutes . The parashah tells the stories of Abraham's three visitors, Abraham's bargaining with God over Sodom and Gomorrah, Lot's two visitors, Lot's bargaining with the Sodomites, Lot's flight, the destruction of Sodom and Gomorrah, how Lot's daughters became pregnant by their father, how Abraham once again passed off his wife Sarah as his sister, the birth of Isaac, the expulsion of Hagar, disputes over wells, and the binding of Isaac (the Akedah).

The parashah has the most words (but not the most letters or verses) of any of the weekly Torah portions in the Book of Genesis, and its word-count is second only to Parashat Naso in the entire Torah. It is made up of 7,862 Hebrew letters, 2,085 Hebrew words, 147 verses, and 252 lines in a Torah Scroll (Sefer Torah). (In the Book of Genesis, Parashat Miketz has the most letters, and Parashiyot Noach and Vayishlach have the most verses.)

Jews read it on the fourth Sabbath after Simchat Torah, in October or November. In Reform Judaism,  is the Torah reading for the one day of Rosh Hashanah.

Readings
In traditional Sabbath Torah reading, the parashah is divided into seven readings (aliyot). In the Masoretic Text of the Tanakh (Hebrew Bible), Parashat Vayeira has four "open portion" (petuchah) divisions (roughly equivalent to paragraphs, often abbreviated with the Hebrew letter  (peh)). Parashat Vayeira has two further subdivisions, called "closed portion" (setumah) divisions (abbreviated with the Hebrew letter  (samekh)) within the first open portion. The first open portion, petuchah) spans the first five readings. The second open portion coincides with the sixth reading. The third open portion covers the binding of Isaac, which is most of the seventh reading, excluding only the concluding maftir reading. And the fourth open portion coincides with the concluding maftir reading. Closed portion divisions further divide the long fourth reading.

First reading – Genesis 18:1–14
In the first reading, as Abraham was sitting in the entrance of his tent by the terebinths of Mamre in the heat of the day, he looked up and saw God in the form of three men. He ran, bowed to the ground, and welcomed them. Abraham offered to wash their feet and fetch them a morsel of bread, and they assented. Abraham rushed to Sarah's tent to order cakes made from choice flour, ran to select a choice calf for a servant-boy to prepare, set curds and milk and the calf before them, and waited on them under the tree as they ate. God then asked Abraham why Sarah had laughed at bearing a child at her age, noting that nothing was too wondrous for God. The first reading ends here.

Second reading – Genesis 18:15–33
In the second reading, frightened, Sarah denied laughing, but God insisted that she had. The men set out toward Sodom, and Abraham walked with them to see them off. God considered whether to confide in Abraham what God was about to do, since God had singled out Abraham to become a great nation and instruct his posterity to keep God's way by doing what was just and right. God told Abraham that the outrage and sin of Sodom and Gomorrah was so great that God was going to see whether they had acted according to the outcry that had reached God. The men went on to Sodom, while Abraham remained standing before God. Abraham pressed God whether God would sweep away the innocent along with the guilty, asking successively if there were 50, or 45, or 40, or 30, or 20, or 10 innocent people in Sodom, would God not spare the city for the sake of the innocent ones, and each time God agreed to do so. When God had finished speaking to Abraham, God departed, and Abraham returned to his place. The second reading ends here with the end of chapter .

Third reading – Genesis 19:1–20
In the third reading, as Lot was sitting at the gate of Sodom in the evening, the two angels arrived, and Lot greeted them and bowed low to the ground. Lot invited the angels to spend the night at his house and bathe their feet, but they said that they would spend the night in the square. Lot urged them strongly, so they went to his house, and he prepared a feast for them and baked unleavened bread, and they ate. Before they had retired for the night, all the men of Sodom gathered about the house shouting to Lot to bring his visitors out so that they might be intimate with them. Lot went outside the entrance, shutting the door behind him, and begged the men of Sodom not commit such a wrong. Lot offered the men his two virgin daughters, if they would not do anything to his guests, but they disparaged Lot as one who had come as an alien and now sought to rule them, and they pressed threateningly against him. But the visitors stretched out their hands and pulled Lot back into the house and shut the door and struck the people with blindness so that they were unable to find the door. The visitors directed Lot to bring what family he had out of the city, for they were about to destroy the place, because the outcry against its inhabitants had become so great. So Lot told his sons-in-law that they needed to get out of the place because God was about to destroy it, but Lot's sons-in-law thought that he was joking. As dawn broke, the angels urged Lot to flee with his wife and two remaining daughters, but still he delayed. So out of God's mercy, the men seized Lot, his wife, and daughters and brought them out of the city, telling them to flee for their lives and not to stop or look back anywhere in the plain. But Lot asked them whether he might flee to a little village nearby. The third reading ends here.

Fourth reading – Genesis 19:21–21:4
In the long fourth reading, the angel replied that he would grant Lot this favor too, and spare that town. The angel urged Lot to hurry there, for the angel could not do anything until he arrived there, and thus the town came to be called Zoar. As the sun rose and Lot entered Zoar, God rained sulfurous fire from heaven on Sodom and Gomorrah and annihilated the entire plain. Lot's wife looked back and turned into a pillar of salt. The next morning, Abraham hurried to the place where he had stood before God and looked down toward Sodom and Gomorrah and saw the smoke rising like at a kiln. Lot was afraid to dwell in Zoar, so he settled in a cave in the hill country with his two daughters. The older daughter told the younger that their father was old, and there was not a man on earth with whom to have children, so she proposed that they get Lot drunk and have sex with him so that they might maintain life through their father. That night they made their father drink wine, and the older one lay with her father without his being aware. And the next day the older one persuaded the younger to do the same. The two daughters thus had children by their father, the older one bore a son named Moab who became the father of the Moabites, and the younger bore a son named Ben-ammi who became the father of the Ammonites. A closed portion ends here with the end of chapter .

As the reading continues in chapter , Abraham settled between Kadesh and Shur. While he was sojourning in Gerar, Abraham said that Sarah was his sister, so King Abimelech had her brought to him, but God came to Abimelech in a dream and told him that taking her would cause him to die, for she was married. Abimelech had not approached her, so he asked God whether God would slay an innocent, as Abraham and Sarah had told him that they were brother and sister. God told Abimelech in the dream that God knew that Abimelech had a blameless heart, and so God had kept him from touching her. God told Abimelech to restore Abraham's wife, since he was a prophet, and he would intercede for Abimelech to save his life, which he would lose if he failed to restore her. Early the next morning, Abimelech told his servants what had happened and asked Abraham what he had done and why he had brought so great a guilt upon Abimelech and his kingdom. Abraham replied that he had thought that Gerar had no fear of God and would kill him because of his wife, and that she was in fact his father's daughter though not his mother's, so he had asked of her the kindness of identifying him as her brother. Abimelech restored Sarah to Abraham, gave him sheep, oxen, and slaves, and invited him to settle wherever he pleased in Abimelech's lands. Abimelech told Sarah that he was giving Abraham a thousand pieces of silver to serve her as vindication before all. Abraham then prayed to God, and God healed Abimelech and the women in his household, so that they bore children, for God had stricken the women with infertility because of Sarah. Another closed portion ends here with the end of chapter .

As the reading continues in chapter , God took note of Sarah, and she bore Abraham a son as God had predicted, and Abraham named him Isaac. Abraham circumcised Isaac when he was eight days old. The fourth reading ends here.

Fifth reading – Genesis 21:5–21
In the fifth reading, Abraham was 100 years old when Isaac was born, and Sarah remarked that God had brought her laughter and everyone would laugh with her about her bearing Abraham a child in his old age. Abraham held a great feast on the day that Sarah weaned Isaac. Sarah saw Hagar's son Ishmael playing, and Sarah told Abraham to cast Hagar and Ishmael out, saying that Ishmael would not share in Abraham's inheritance with Isaac. Sarah's words greatly distressed Abraham, but God told Abraham not to be distressed but to do whatever Sarah told him, for Isaac would carry on Abraham's line, and God would make a nation of Ishmael, too. Early the next morning, Abraham placed some bread and water on Hagar's shoulder, together with Ishmael, and sent them away. Hagar and Ishmael wandered in the wilderness of Beersheba, and when the water ran out, she left the child under a bush, sat down about two bowshots away so as not to see the child die, and burst into tears. God heard the cry of the boy, and an angel called to Hagar, saying not to fear, for God had heeded the boy's cry, and would make of him a great nation. Then God opened her eyes to a well of water, and she and the boy drank. God was with Ishmael and he grew up in the wilderness and became a bowman. Ishmael lived in the wilderness of Paran, and Hagar got him an Egyptian wife. The fifth reading and the first open portion end here.

Sixth reading – Genesis 21:22–34
In the sixth reading, Abimelech and Phicol the chief of his troops asked Abraham to swear not to deal falsely with them. Abraham reproached Abimelech because Abimelech's servants had seized Abraham's well, but Abimelech protested ignorance. Abraham gave Abimelech sheep and oxen and the two men made a pact. Abraham then offered Abimelech seven ewes as proof that Abraham had dug the well. They called the place Beersheba, for the two of them swore an oath there. After they concluded their pact, Abimelech and Phicol returned to Philistia, and Abraham planted a tamarisk and invoked God's name. Abraham lived in Philistia a long time. The sixth reading and the second open portion end here with the end of chapter .

Seventh reading – Genesis chapter 22
In the seventh reading, which coincides with chapter , sometime later, God tested Abraham, directing him to take Isaac to the land of Moriah and offer him there as a burnt offering. Early the next morning, Abraham saddled his donkey and split wood for the burnt offering, and then he, two of his servants, and Isaac set out for the place that God had named. On the third day, Abraham saw the place from afar, and directed his servants to wait with the donkey, while Isaac and he went up to worship and then return. Abraham took the firestone and the knife, put the wood on Isaac, and the two walked off together. When Isaac asked Abraham where the sheep was for the burnt offering, Abraham replied that God would see to the sheep for the burnt offering. They arrived at the place that God had named, and Abraham built an altar, laid out the wood, bound Isaac, laid him on the altar, and picked up the knife to slay him. Then an angel called to Abraham, telling him not to raise his hand against the boy, for now God knew that Abraham feared God, since he had not withheld his son. Abraham looked up and saw a ram caught in a thicket by its horns, so he offered it as a burnt offering in place of his son. Abraham named the site Adonai-yireh. The angel called to Abraham a second time, saying that because Abraham had not withheld his son, God would bless him and make his descendants as numerous as the stars of heaven and the sands on the seashore, and victorious over their foes. All the nations of the earth would bless themselves by Abraham's descendants, because he obeyed God's command. Abraham returned to his servants, and they departed for Beersheba, where Abraham stayed. The third open portion ends here.

As the seventh reading continues with the maftir reading that concludes the parashah, later, Abraham learned that Milcah had borne eight children to his brother Nahor, among whom was Bethuel, who became the father of Rebekah. Nahor's concubine Reumah also bore him four children. The seventh reading, the fourth open portion, chapter , and the parashah end here.

Readings according to the triennial cycle
Jews who read the Torah according to the triennial cycle of Torah reading read the parashah according to the following schedule:

In inner-Biblical interpretation
The parashah has parallels or is discussed in these Biblical sources:

Genesis chapter 18
In , the prophet Amos reported, "Indeed, my Lord God does nothing without having revealed His purpose to His servants the prophets."

 explains what the "grievous" sin was that  reported in Sodom.  says that Sodom's iniquity was pride. Sodom had plenty of bread and careless ease, but Sodom did not help the poor and the needy. The people of Sodom were haughty and committed abomination, so God removed them.

 condemns the prophets of Jerusalem for becoming like the inhabitants of Sodom and Gomorrah in that they committed a horrible thing, they committed adultery, they walked in lies, they strengthened the hands of evil-doers, and they did not return from their wickedness.

 judged the iniquity of Jerusalem that lead to the Babylonian captivity as greater than the sin of Sodom that led to its destruction in an instant.

In , Abraham asked, "Shall not the Judge of all the earth do justly?" God's role as Judge and God's justice are recurring themes in the Hebrew Bible (Tanakh). In Psalm , the Psalmist tells God, "You have maintained my right and my cause; You sat upon the throne as the righteous Judge."  ( in the KJV) affirms that "there is a God that judges in the earth." And  similarly calls God "Judge of the earth."  reports that God "executes justice for the fatherless and widow."  reports that God "loves righteousness and justice." In , the Psalmist tells God, "Righteousness and justice are the foundation of Your throne."  says that God "executes righteousness, and acts of justice for all who are oppressed";  ( in the KJV) says that God "will maintain the cause of the poor, and the right of the needy"; and  says that God "executes justice for the oppressed." And , quotes God saying, "I will make justice the line, and righteousness the plummet." Steven Schwarzschild concluded in the Encyclopaedia Judaica that "God's primary attribute of action . . . is justice" and "Justice has widely been said to be the moral value which singularly characterizes Judaism."

Genesis chapter 19

Genesis chapter 22

In , God promised that Abraham's descendants would as numerous as the stars of heaven and the sands on the seashore. In , God reminded Isaac that God had promised Abraham that God would make his heirs as numerous as the stars. In , Jacob reminded God that God had promised that Jacob's descendants would be as numerous as the sands. In , Moses reminded God that God had promised to make the Patriarchs’ descendants as numerous as the stars. In , Moses reported that God had multiplied the Israelites until they were then as numerous as the stars. In , Moses reported that God had made the Israelites as numerous as the stars. And  foretold that the Israelites would be reduced in number after having been as numerous as the stars.

In early nonrabbinic interpretation
The parashah has parallels or is discussed in these early nonrabbinic sources:

Genesis chapters 12–23
The second century BCE Book of Jubilees reported that Abraham endured ten trials and was found faithful and patient in spirit. Jubilees listed eight of the trials: (1) leaving his country, (2) the famine, (3) the wealth of kings, (4) his wife taken from him, (5) circumcision, (6) Hagar and Ishmael driven away, (7) the binding of Isaac, and (8) buying the land to bury Sarah.

Genesis chapter 19
Josephus taught that Lot entreated the angels to accept lodging with him because he had learned to be a generous and hospitable man by imitating Abraham.

The Wisdom of Solomon held that Wisdom delivered the "righteous" Lot, who fled from the wicked who perished when the fire came down on the five cities.

In classical rabbinic interpretation
The parashah is discussed in these rabbinic sources from the era of the Mishnah and the Talmud:

Genesis chapter 18
The Mishnah taught that Abraham suffered ten trials and withstood them all, demonstrating how great was Abraham's love for God. The Avot of Rabbi Natan taught that two trials were at the time he was bidden to leave Haran, two were with his two sons, two were with his two wives, one was in the wars of the Kings, one was at the covenant between the pieces, one was in Ur of the Chaldees (where, according to a tradition, he was thrown into a furnace and came out unharmed), and one was the covenant of circumcision. Similarly, the Pirke De-Rabbi Eliezer counted as the 10 trials (1) when Abraham was a child and all the magnates of the kingdom and the magicians sought to kill him, (2) when he was put into prison for ten years and cast into the furnace of fire, (3) his migration from his father's house and from the land of his birth, (4) the famine, (5) when Sarah his wife was taken to be Pharaoh's wife, (6) when the kings came against him to slay him, (7) when (in the words of ) "the word of the Lord came to Abram in a vision," (8) when Abram was 99 years old and God asked him to circumcise himself, (9) when Sarah asked Abraham (in the words of ) to "Cast out this bondwoman and her son," and (10) the binding of Isaac. And the Mekhilta of Rabbi Ishmael taught that Abraham inherited both this world and the World To Come as a reward for his faith, as  says, "And he believed in the Lord."

Rabbi Hama son of Rabbi Ḥanina taught that visiting the infirm (as God did in ) demonstrates one of God's attributes that humans should emulate. Rabbi Hama asked what  means in the text, "You shall walk after the Lord your God." How can a human being walk after God, when  says, "[T]he Lord your God is a devouring fire"? Rabbi Hama explained that the command to walk after God means to walk after the attributes of God. As God clothes the naked — for  says, "And the Lord God made for Adam and for his wife coats of skin, and clothed them" — so should we also clothe the naked. God visited the sick — for  says, "And the Lord appeared to him by the oaks of Mamre" (after Abraham was circumcised in ) — so should we also visit the sick. God comforted mourners — for  says, "And it came to pass after the death of Abraham, that God blessed Isaac his son" — so should we also comfort mourners. God buried the dead — for  says, "And He buried him in the valley" — so should we also bury the dead. Similarly, the Sifre on  taught that to walk in God's ways means to be (in the words of ) "merciful and gracious."

Consequently,  reports, "And the Lord appeared to him [Abraham]."

God appears to nations other that Israel only as one who comes from a distance, as  says, "They came from a far country to me." But in connection with the prophets of Israel,  says, "And the Lord appeared," and  says, "And the Lord called," implying from the immediate vicinity. Rabbi Ḥaninah compared the difference between the prophets of Israel and the prophets of other nations to a king who was with his friend in a chamber separated by a curtain. Whenever the king desired to speak to his friend, he folded up the curtain and spoke to him. But God speaks to the prophets of other nations without folding back the curtain. The Rabbis compared it to a king who has a wife and a concubine; to his wife he goes openly, but to his concubine he repairs with stealth. Similarly, God appears to non-Jews only at night, as  says, "And God came to Balaam at night," and  says, "And God came to Laban the Aramean in a dream of the night."

The Pirke De-Rabbi Eliezer taught that God was revealed to all the prophets in a vision, but to Abraham God was revealed in a revelation and a vision.  tells of the revelation when it says, “And the Lord appeared to him by the oaks of Mamre.” And  tells of the vision when it says, “After these things the word of the Lord came to Abram in a vision.”

According to the Midrash, Abraham reasoned that after he circumcised himself, many proselytes flocked (hikkif) to attach themselves to the covenant, and it was thus because Abraham did so that God revealed God's Self to Abraham, as  reports, "And the Lord appeared to him." (And thus through circumcision performed on his flesh did Abraham come to see God.)

A Midrash interpreted Song of Songs , "My beloved is like a gazelle or a young hart; behold, he stands behind our wall," to apply to God's Presence in the synagogue. The Midrash read the words, "behold, He stands behind our wall," to allude to the occasion in  when God came to visit Abraham on the third day after Abraham's circumcision.  says, "And the Lord appeared to him by the terebinths of Mamre, as he sat (yoshev) . . . ." The word for "he sat" is in a form that can be read yashav, the letter vav being omitted, as though it read that Abraham was sitting before he saw God, but on seeing God, he wanted to stand up. But God told him to sit, as Abraham would serve as a symbol for his children, for when his children would come into their synagogues and houses of study and recite the Shema, they would be sitting down and God's Glory would stand by. To support this reading, the Midrash cited , "God stands in the congregation of God."

And thus, "the Lord appear to him."

For God made Abraham great by allowing Abraham to sit (on account of his age and weakness after his circumcision) while the Shekhinah stood, as  reports, "And the Lord appeared to him in the plains of Mamre, as he sat in the tent door."

Rav Judah said in Rav's name that  showed that hospitality to wayfarers is greater than welcoming the Divine Presence.

Michael came to tell Sarah of Isaac's birth, Raphael came to heal Abraham, and Gabriel came to destroy Sodom. Noting that  reports that "the two angels came to Sodom," the Gemara explained that Michael accompanied Gabriel to rescue Lot.

The Gemara deduced the behavior of the wicked from Ephron, who in  said, "The land is worth 400 shekels of silver," but  reports, "And Abraham hearkened to Ephron; and Abraham weighed to Ephron the silver, which he had named in the audience of the sons of Heth, 400 shekels of silver, current money with the merchant," indicating that Ephron refused to accept anything but centenaria (which are more valuable than ordinary shekels).

In , the heart is refreshed. A Midrash catalogued the wide range capabilities of the heart reported in the Hebrew Bible. The heart speaks, sees, hears, walks, falls, stands, rejoices, cries, is comforted, is troubled, becomes hardened, grows faint, grieves, fears, can be broken, becomes proud, rebels, invents, cavils, overflows, devises, desires, goes astray, lusts, can be stolen, is humbled, is enticed, errs, trembles, is awakened, loves, hates, envies, is searched, is rent, meditates, is like a fire, is like a stone, turns in repentance, becomes hot, dies, melts, takes in words, is susceptible to fear, gives thanks, covets, becomes hard, makes merry, acts deceitfully, speaks from out of itself, loves bribes, writes words, plans, receives commandments, acts with pride, makes arrangements, and aggrandizes itself.

Ephraim Maksha'ah, a disciple of Rabbi Meir, said in his teacher's name that Abraham ate even unconsecrated food (chullin) only when it was ritually pure, and that day Sarah had her menstrual period (and so the bread that she baked was ritually impure by virtue of this phenomenon that reflected the rejuvenation that was to make the birth of Isaac possible). Similarly, the Pirke de Rabbi Eliezer taught that when the three angels visited Abraham, Abraham ran to meet them and prepare for them a great banquet. He told Sarah to prepare cakes for them, but when Sarah was kneading, she perceived that the manner of women was upon her, so Abraham did not serve his visitors any of the cakes. Rather, Abraham ran to fetch a calf, but the calf fled from him and went into the cave of Machpelah. Abraham chased in after the calf, and found Adam and Eve lying there upon their beds. Lights were kindled above them, and a sweet scent was upon them. Abraham consequently sought to get the cave as a burial possession, as  reports.

The Gemara read , "And they said to him, 'Where is Sarah your wife?' And he said, 'Behold, she is in the tent,'" to teach us that Sarah was modest (and therefore kept secluded). Rav Judah said in Rav's name that the ministering angels knew that Sarah was in the tent, but they brought out the fact that she was in the tent to make her more beloved to Abraham (by impressing him with her modesty). Rabbi Jose son of Rabbi Ḥanina said that they brought out the fact that she was in the tent to send her the wine-cup of benediction (the wine-cup over which the Grace after Meals is recited and which is shared by all the guests).

The Gemara reported that sages in the Land of Israel (and some said Rabbi Isaac) deduced from Sarah's practice as shown in  that while it was customary for a man to meet wayfarers, it was not customary for a woman to do so. The Gemara cited this deduction to support the ruling of Mishnah Yevamot 8:3 that while a male Ammonite or Moabite was forbidden from entering the congregation of Israel, an Ammonite or Moabite woman was permitted.

Rabbi Haggai said in Rabbi Isaac's name that all of the Matriarchs were prophets.

Similarly, in the Jerusalem Talmud, Rabbi Ḥanina said that Scripture teaches how awful the penumbra of gossip is, for  speaks evasively to keep the peace between Abraham and Sarah.

Ravina asked one of the Rabbis who expounded Aggadah before him for the origin of the Rabbinic saying, "The memory of the righteous shall be for a blessing." The Rabbi replied that  says, "The memory of the righteous shall be for a blessing." Ravina asked from where in the Torah one might derive that teaching. The Rabbi answered that  says, "Shall I hide from Abraham that which I am doing?"

The Gemara cited  to show that Abraham walked righteously and followed the commandments. Rabbi Simlai taught that God communicated to Moses a total of 613 commandments — 365 negative commandments, corresponding to the number of days in the solar year, and 248 positive commandments, corresponding to the number of the parts in the human body. The Gemara taught that David reduced the number of precepts to eleven, as  says, "Lord, who shall sojourn in Your Tabernacle? Who shall dwell in Your holy mountain? — He who (1) walks uprightly, and (2) works righteousness, and (3) speaks truth in his heart; who (4) has no slander upon his tongue, (5) nor does evil to his fellow, (6) nor takes up a reproach against his neighbor, (7) in whose eyes a vile person is despised, but (8) he honors them who fear the Lord, (9) he swears to his own hurt and changes not, (10) he puts not out his money on interest, (11) nor takes a bribe against the innocent." Isaiah reduced them to six principles, as  says, "He who (1) walks righteously, and (2) speaks uprightly, (3) he who despises the gain of oppressions, (4) who shakes his hand from holding of bribes, (5) who stops his ear from hearing of blood, (6) and shuts his eyes from looking upon evil; he shall dwell on high." The Gemara explained that "he who walks righteously" referred to Abraham, as  says, "For I have known him, to the end that he may command his children and his household after him." Micah reduced the commandments to three principles, as  says, "It has been told you, o man, what is good, and what the Lord requires of you: only (1) to do justly, and (2) to love mercy, and (3) to walk humbly before your God." Isaiah reduced them to two principles, as  says, "Thus says the Lord, (1) Keep justice and (2) do righteousness." Amos reduced them to one principle, as  says, "For thus says the Lord to the house of Israel, 'Seek Me and live.'" To this Rav Nahman bar Isaac demurred, saying that this might be taken as: "Seek Me by observing the whole Torah and live." The Gemara concluded that Habakkuk based all the Torah's commandments on one principle, as  says, "But the righteous shall live by his faith."

The Gemara taught that  sets forth one of the three most distinguishing virtues of the Jewish People. The Gemara taught that David told the Gibeonites that the Israelites are distinguished by three characteristics: They are merciful, bashful, and benevolent. They are merciful, for  says that God would "show you (the Israelites) mercy, and have compassion upon you, and multiply you." And they are benevolent, for  says of Abraham "that he may command his children and his household after him, that they may keep the way of the Lord, to do righteousness and justice." The Gemara taught that David told the Gibeonites that only one who cultivates these three characteristics is fit to join the Jewish People.

Rabbi Eleazar taught that from the blessing of the righteous one may infer a curse for the wicked. For  speaks of the blessing of the righteous Abraham, saying, "For I have known him, to the end that he may command." And soon thereafter  speaks of the curse of the wicked people of Sodom and Gomorrah, saying, "Truly the cry of Sodom and Gomorrah is great."

The Mishnah taught that some viewed the people of Sodom as embracing a philosophy of "what's mine is mine." The Mishnah taught that there are four types of people: (1) One who says: "What's mine is mine, and what's yours is yours"; this is a neutral type, some say this was the type of Sodom. (2) One who says: "What's mine is yours, and what's yours is mine"; this is an unlearned person. (3) One who says: "What's mine is yours, and what's yours is yours"; this is a pious person. And (4) one who says: "What's mine is mine, and what's yours is mine;" this is a wicked person.

The Tosefta employed verses from the book of Job to teach that the people of Sodom acted arrogantly before God because of the good that God had lavished on them. As  says, "As for the land, out of it comes bread ... Its stones are the place of sapphires, and it has dust of gold. That path, no bird of prey knows ... The proud beasts have not trodden it." The people of Sodom reasoned that since bread, silver, gold, precious stones, and pearls came forth from their land, they did not need immigrants to come to Sodom. They reasoned that immigrants came only to take things away from Sodom and thus resolved to forget the traditional ways of hospitality. God told the people of Sodom that because of the goodness that God had lavished upon them, they had deliberately forgotten how things were customarily done in the world, and thus God would make them be forgotten from the world. As  says, "They open shafts in a valley from where men live. They are forgotten by travelers. They hang afar from men, they swing to and fro." As  says, "In the thought of one who is at ease, there is contempt for misfortune; it is ready for those whose feet slip. The tents of robbers are at peace, and those who provoke God are secure, who bring their god in their
Hand." And so as  says, "As I live, says the Lord God, Sodom your sister has not done, she nor her daughters, as you and your daughters have done. Behold, this was the iniquity of your sister Sodom: pride, plenty of bread, and careless ease was in her and in her daughters; neither did she strengthen the hand of the poor and needy. And they were haughty, and committed abomination before Me; therefore I removed them when I saw it."

You shall be slain all of you; you are all as a bowing wall, and as a tottering fence." Rava interpreted this to teach that the people of Sodom would cast envious eyes on the wealthy, place them by a tottering wall, push the wall down on them, and take their wealth. Rava interpreted this to teach that they used to cast envious eyes on wealthy people and entrust fragrant balsam into their keeping, which they placed in their storerooms. In the evening the people of Sodom would smell it out like dogs, as  says, "They return at evening, they make a noise like a dog, and go round about the city." Then they would burrow in and steal the money.

The Gemara told that there were four judges in Sodom, named Shakrai, Shakurai, Zayyafi, and Mazle Dina (meaning "Liar," "Awful Liar," "Forger," and "Perverter of Justice"). If a man assaulted his neighbor's wife and caused a miscarriage, the judges would tell the husband to give his wife to the neighbor so that the neighbor might make her pregnant. If a person cut off the ear of a neighbor's donkey, they would order the owner to give it to the offender until the ear grew again. If a person wounded a neighbor, they would tell the victim to pay the offender a fee for bleeding the victim. A person who crossed over with the ferry had to pay four zuzim, but the person who crossed through the water had to pay eight.

When the people of Sodom found out about her generosity, they punished her by smearing her with honey and placing her on the city wall, where the bees consumed her. Rav Judah thus taught in Rav's name that  indicates that God destroyed Sodom on account of the maiden (ribah).

Noting that  does not say "their cry" but "her cry," Rabbi Judah told that the people of Sodom issued a proclamation that anyone who gave a loaf of bread to the poor or needy would be burned. Lot's daughter Pelotit, the wife of a magnate of Sodom, saw a poor man on the street, and was moved with compassion. Every day when she went out to draw water, she smuggled all kinds of provisions to him from her house in her pitcher. The men of Sodom questioned how the poor man could survive. When they found out, they brought Pelotit out to be burned. She cried out to God to maintain her cause, and her cry ascended before the Throne of Glory. And God said (in the words of ) "I will go down now, and see whether they have done altogether according to her cry that has come to Me."

The Midrash answered, so that there might be enough for a minyan of righteous people to pray on behalf of all of the people of Sodom. Alternatively, the Midrash said, because at the generation of the Flood, eight righteous people remained (in Noah and his family) and God did not give the world respite for their sake. Alternatively, the Midrash said, because Lot thought that there were ten righteous people in Sodom — namely Lot, his wife, his four daughters, and his four sons-in-law (but Lot was apparently mistaken in thinking them righteous). Rabbi Judah the son of Rabbi Simon and Rabbi Ḥanin in Rabbi Joḥanan's name said that ten were required for Sodom, but for Jerusalem even one would have sufficed, as  says, "Run to and fro in the streets of Jerusalem . . . and seek . . . if you can find a man, if there be any who does justly . . . and I will pardon her." And thus  says, "Adding one thing to another, to find out the account." Rabbi Isaac explained that an account can be extended as far as one man for one city. And thus if one righteous person can be found in a city, it can be saved in the merit of that righteous person.

Did Abraham's prayer to God in  change God's harsh decree? Could it have? Rabbi Abbahu read  to teach that God rules humankind, but the righteous rule God, for God makes a decree, and the righteous may through their prayer annul it.

Genesis chapter 19
The Rabbis in a Midrash asked why the angels took so long to travel from Abraham's camp to Sodom, leaving Abraham at noon and arriving in Sodom only (as  reports) "in the evening." The Midrash explained that they were angels of mercy, and thus they delayed, thinking that perhaps Abraham might find something to change Sodom's fate, but when Abraham found nothing, as  reports, "the two angels came to Sodom in the evening."

The Midrash explained that earlier, when the Shechinah (the Divine Presence) was above them, Scripture called them men, but as soon as the Shechinah departed from them, they assumed the form of angels. Rabbi Levi (or others say Rabbi Tanḥuma in the name of Rabbi Levi) said that to Abraham, whose spiritual strength was great, they looked like men (as Abraham was as familiar with angels as with men). But to Lot, whose spiritual strength was weak, they appeared as angels. Rabbi Ḥanina taught that before they performed their mission, they were called "men." But having performed their mission, they are referred to as "angels." Rabbi Tanḥuma compared them to a person who received a governorship from the king. Before reaching the seat of authority, the person goes about like an ordinary citizen. Similarly, before they performed their mission, Scripture calls them "men," but having performed their mission, Scripture calls them "angels."

The Pirke De-Rabbi Eliezer taught that Lot walked with Abraham and learned Abraham's good deeds and ways. The Sages told that Abraham made for himself a house outside Haran, and received all who entered into or went out from Haran, and gave them food and drink. He encouraged them to acknowledge the God of Abraham as the only One in the universe. When Lot came to Sodom, he did likewise. When the people of Sodom proclaimed that all who help the poor or needy with a loaf of bread would be burnt by fire, Lot became afraid, and did not help the poor by day, but did so by night, as  reports, “And the two angels came to Sodom at evening; and Lot sat in the gate of Sodom.” Lot saw the two angels walking in the street of the city, and he thought that they were wayfarers in the land, and he ran to meet them. He invited them to lodge overnight in his house and eat and drink. But Lot's wife Edith was stirred with pity for her daughters, who were married in Sodom, and she looked back behind her to see if they were coming after her. And she saw behind the Shechinah, and she became a pillar of salt, as  reports, “And his wife looked back from behind him, and she became a pillar of salt.”

Rabbi Elazar taught that from here we learn that one may decline the request of a lesser person, but not that of a great person.

A Midrash expounded on the conversation between Lot and the angels. Lot replied that in every town there are good people and bad people, but in Sodom the overwhelming majority were bad. Then (in the words of ) "the men of the city, the men of sodom, compassed the house round, both young and old," not one of them objecting. And then (in the words of ) "they called to Lot, and said to him: 'Where are the men that came to you this night? Bring them out to us, that we may know them.'" Rabbi Joshua ben Levi said in the name of Rabbi Padiah that Lot prayed for mercy on the Sodomites' behalf the whole night, and the angels would have heeded him. But when the Sodomites demanded (in the words of ) "Bring them out to us, that we may know them," that is, for sexual purposes, the angels asked Lot (in the words of ) "Do you have here (poh) any besides?" Which one could read as asking, "What else do you have in your mouth (peh) (to say in their favor)?" Then the angels told Lot that up until then, he had the right to plead in their defense, but thereafter, he had no right to plead for them.

But the Gemara noted that as  reports that "the angels hastened Lot," they could naturally have covered more ground than a typical person.

Behold your servant has found favor in your eyes, and you have magnified Your mercy that You have performed for me by saving my life.’” The Gemara taught that one can deduce from the context that Lot addressed God, as Lot spoke to the One Who has the capacity to kill and to bring to life.

Rather, the word “close” must indicate that its settling was close — that it had been recently settled — and therefore that its sins were few. Thus, Rava bar Meḥasseya said that Rav Ḥama bar Gurya said Rav said that a person should always live in a recently settled city, as its residents will not yet have had the opportunity to commit many sins there. Rabbi Avin taught that the words, “I will escape there please (na),” in  teach that Zoar was newer than other cities. The numerological value of nun alef, the letters of the word , na, is 51, while Sodom was 52 years old. And Rabbi Avin taught that Sodom's tranquil period during which it committed its sins was 26 years, as  reports: “Twelve years they served Chedorlaomer and thirteen years they rebelled, and in the fourteenth year Chedorlaomer came.” The 12 plus 14 years during which they were enslaved were not years of tranquility, leaving only 26 tranquil years during which they were sinful.

Rabbi Eliezer taught that Lot lived in Sodom only on account of his property, but Rabbi Eliezer deduced from  that Lot left Sodom empty-handed with the angels telling him, "It is enough that you escape with your life." Rabbi Eliezer argued that Lot's experience proved the maxim (of Mishnah Sanhedrin 10:5) that the property of the wicked, whether inside or outside the town, will be lost.

Rabbi Meir taught that while  made clear that God would never again flood the world with water,  demonstrated that God might bring a flood of fire and brimstone, as God brought upon Sodom and Gomorrah.

The Midrash answered that it was the silence that Lot maintained for Abraham when Abraham passed off Sarah as his sister.

Interpreting , a Midrash taught that (as Mishnah Shabbat 16:1 rules, if one's house is burning on the Sabbath) one is permitted to save the case of the Torah along with the Torah itself, and one is permitted to save the Tefillin bag along with the Tefillin. This teaches that the righteous are fortunate, and so are those who cleave to them. Similarly,  says, "God remembered Noah, and all beasts, and all the animals that were with him in the Ark."

Rabbi Hiyya bar Abba, citing Rabbi Joḥanan, taught that God rewards even polite speech.

Genesis chapter 20
The Rabbis taught that God thus appeared more openly to the prophets of Israel than to those of other nations. The Rabbis compared God's action to those of a king who has both a wife and a concubine; to his wife he goes openly, but to his concubine he goes stealthily.

The Gemara taught that a dream is a sixtieth part of prophecy. Rabbi Hanan taught that even if the Master of Dreams (an angel, in a dream that truly foretells the future) tells a person that on the next day the person will die, the person should not desist from prayer, for as  says, "For in the multitude of dreams are vanities and also many words, but fear God." (Although a dream may seem reliably to predict the future, it will not necessarily come true; one must place one's trust in God.) Rabbi Samuel bar Nahmani said in the name of Rabbi Jonathan that a person is shown in a dream only what is suggested by the person's own thoughts (while awake), as  says, "As for you, Oh King, your thoughts came into your mind upon your bed," and  says, "That you may know the thoughts of the heart." When Samuel had a bad dream, he used to quote , "The dreams speak falsely." The Gemara resolved the contradiction, teaching that , "I speak with him in a dream?" refers to dreams that come through an angel, whereas , "The dreams speak falsely," refers to dreams that come through a demon.

The Mishnah deduced from the example of Abimelech and Abraham in  that even though an offender pays the victim compensation, the offence is not forgiven until the offender asks the victim for pardon. And the Mishnah deduced from Abraham's example of praying for Abimelech in  that under such circumstances, the victim would be churlish not to forgive the offender. The Tosefta further deduced from  that even if the offender did not seek forgiveness from the victim, the victim must nonetheless seek mercy for the offender.

Rabbi Isaac taught that Abimelech's curse of Sarah caused her son Isaac's blindness (as reported in ). Rabbi Isaac read the words, "it is for you a covering (kesut) of the eyes," in  not as kesut, "covering," but as kesiyat, "blinding." Rabbi Isaac concluded that one should not consider a small matter the curse of even an ordinary person.

Rava noted that Abraham prayed to God to heal Abimelech and his wife of infertility (in ) and immediately thereafter God allowed Abraham and Sarah to conceive (in ).

Reading , the Midrash told that the people realized that they had spoken against Moses and prostrated themselves before him and beseeched him to pray to God on their behalf. The Midrash taught that then  immediately reports, "And Moses prayed," to demonstrate the meekness of Moses, who did not hesitate to seek mercy for them, and also to show the power of repentance, for as soon as they said, "We have sinned," Moses was immediately reconciled to them, for one who is in a position to forgive should not be cruel by refusing to forgive. In the same strain,  reports, "And Abraham prayed to God; and God healed" (after Abimelech had wronged Abraham and asked for forgiveness). And similarly,  reports, "And the Lord changed the fortune of Job, when he prayed for his friends" (after they had slandered him). The Midrash taught that when one person wrongs another but then says, "I have sinned," the victim is called a sinner if the victim does not forgive the offender.

Genesis chapter 21
The Rabbis linked parts of the parashah to Rosh Hashanah. And in the Talmud, Rabbi Eliezer said that God visited both Sarah and Hannah to grant them conception on Rosh Hashanah. Rabbi Eliezer deduced this from the Bible's parallel uses of the words "visiting" and "remembering" in description of Hannah, Sarah, and Rosh Hashanah. First, Rabbi Eliezer linked Hannah's visitation with Rosh Hashanah through the Bible's parallel uses of the word "remembering."  says that God "remembered" Hannah and she conceived, and  describes Rosh Hashanah as "a remembering of the blast of the trumpet." Then Rabbi Eliezer linked Hannah's conception with Sarah's through the Bible's parallel uses of the word "visiting."  says that "the Lord had visited Hannah," and  says that "the Lord visited Sarah."

Reading , “And Sarah conceived, and bore Abraham a son (Isaac) in his old age, at the set time (mo'ed) of which God had spoken to him,” Rabbi Huna taught in Hezekiah's name that Isaac was born at midday.

Citing , the Pesikta de-Rav Kahana taught that Sarah was one of seven barren women about whom  says (speaking of God), "He . . . makes the barren woman to dwell in her house as a joyful mother of children." The Pesikta de-Rav Kahana also listed Rebekah, Rachel, Leah, Manoah's wife, Hannah, and Zion.

Rav Avira taught (sometimes in the name of Rabbi Ammi, sometimes in the name of Rabbi Assi) that the words "And the child grew, and was weaned (va-yigamal), and Abraham made a great feast on the day that Isaac was weaned" in  teach that God will make a great feast for the righteous on the day that God manifests (yigmol) God's love to Isaac's descendants. After they have eaten and drunk, they will ask Abraham to recite the Grace after meals (Birkat Hamazon), but Abraham will answer that he cannot say Grace, because he fathered Ishmael. Then they will ask Isaac to say Grace, but Isaac will answer that he cannot say Grace, because he fathered Esau. Then they will ask Moses, but Moses will answer that he cannot, because God did not allow him to enter the Land of Israel either in life or in death. Then they will ask Joshua, but Joshua will answer that he cannot, because he was not privileged to have a son, for  reports, "Nun was his son, Joshua was his son," without listing further descendants. Then they will ask David, and he will say Grace, and find it fitting for him to do so, because  records David saying, "I will lift up the cup of salvation, and call upon the name of the Lord."

The Gemara cited  to teach that Sarah was one of seven prophetesses who prophesied to Israel and neither took away from nor added anything to what is written in the Torah. (The other prophetesses were Miriam, Deborah, Hannah, Abigail, Huldah, and Esther.) Rabbi Isaac taught that Yiscah was Sarah.  called her Yiscah because she discerned (saketah) by means of Divine inspiration, as  reports God instructing Abraham, "In all that Sarah says to you, hearken to her voice." Alternatively,  called her Yiscah because all gazed (sakin) at her beauty.

The Pirke De-Rabbi Eliezer told that Ishmael cast himself beneath thorns in the wilderness, so that he might get some moisture, and called out to the God of his father Abraham to take away his soul, so that he would not have to die of thirst. And God was entreated, as  reports, "God has heard the voice of the lad where he is."

Rabbi Isaac said that Heaven judges people only on their actions up to the time of judgment, as  says, "God has heard the voice of the lad as he is there." God demanded what Ishmael was at that time. The angels answered that Ishmael (at that time) was righteous. God replied that God judges people only as they are at the moment.

Rabbi Simeon wept that Hagar, the handmaid of Rabbi Simeon's ancestor Abraham's house, was found worthy of meeting an angel on three occasions, while Rabbi Simeon did not meet an angel even once.

Rabbi Tarfon read  to associate Mount Paran with the children of Ishmael. Rabbi Tarfon taught that God came from Mount Sinai (or others say Mount Seir) and was revealed to the children of Esau, as  says, "The Lord came from Sinai, and rose from Seir to them," and "Seir" means the children of Esau, as  says, "And Esau dwelt in Mount Seir." God asked them whether they would accept the Torah, and they asked what was written in it. From there, God turned and was revealed to the children of Ishmael, as  says, "He shined forth from Mount Paran," and "Paran" means the children of Ishmael, as  says of Ishmael, "And he dwelt in the wilderness of Paran." God asked them whether they would accept the Torah, and they asked what was written in it. From there, God sent messengers to all the nations of the world asking them whether they would accept the Torah, and they asked what was written in it. They replied that they had no delight in the Torah, therefore let God give it to God's people, as  says, "The Lord will give strength [identified with the Torah] to His people; the Lord will bless His people with peace." From there, God returned and was revealed to the children of Israel, as  says, "And he came from the ten thousands of holy ones," and the expression "ten thousands" means the children of Israel, as  says, "And when it rested, he said, 'Return, O Lord, to the ten thousands of the thousands of Israel.'" With God were thousands of chariots and 20,000 angels, and God's right hand held the Torah, as  says, "At his right hand was a fiery law to them."

The Sifre read  to indicate that Moses spoke to the Israelites in rebuke. The Sifre taught that Moses rebuked them only when he approached death, and the Sifre taught that Moses learned this lesson from Jacob, who admonished his sons in  only when he neared death. The Sifre cited four reasons why people do not admonish others until the admonisher nears death: (1) so that the admonisher does not have to repeat the admonition, (2) so that the one rebuked would not suffer undue shame from being seen again, (3) so that the one rebuked would not bear ill will to the admonisher, and (4) so that the one may depart from the other in peace, for admonition brings peace.

Rabbi Jose bar Ḥanina said that love unaccompanied by reproof is not love. And Resh Lakish taught that reproof leads to peace, and thus (as  reports) "Abraham reproved Abimelech." Resh Lakish said that peace unaccompanied by reproof is not peace.

Genesis chapter 22
Rabbi Joḥanan, on the authority of Rabbi Jose ben Zimra, asked what  means by the word "after" in "And it came to pass after these words, that God did tempt Abraham." Rabbi Joḥanan explained that it meant after the words of Satan, as follows. Rather, Abraham did nothing but honor his son. God replied that were God to ask Abraham to sacrifice his son to God, Abraham would do so without hesitation. Straightway, as  reports, "God did tempt Abraham."

Ishmael told Isaac that Ishmael was more virtuous than Isaac in good deeds, for Isaac was circumcised at eight days (and so could not prevent it), but Ishmael was circumcised at 13 years. Isaac questioned whether Ishamel would incense Isaac on account of one limb. Isaac vowed that if God were to ask Isaac to sacrifice himself before God, Isaac would obey. Immediately thereafter (in the words of ) "God did prove Abraham."

He attained priesthood, as  says, "The Lord has sworn, and will not repent: 'You are a priest forever after the manner of Melchizedek." And he attained kingship, as  says, "You are a mighty prince among us."

Rabbi Simeon bar Abba compared this to a king who was confronted by many wars, which he won with the aid of a great warrior. Subsequently, he was faced with a severe battle. Thereupon the king asked the warrior, "I pray, assist me in battle, so that people may not say that there was nothing to the earlier battles." Similarly, God said to Abraham, "I have tested you with many trials and you withstood all of them. Now, be firm, for My sake in this trial, so that people may not say that there was nothing to the earlier trials."

God told Abraham, "take your son," but Abraham replied, "I have two sons!" God said, "Your only one," but Abraham replied, "Each is the only one of his mother!" God said, "Whom you love," but Abraham replied, "I love them both!" Then God said, "Isaac!" The Gemara explained that God employed all this circumlocution in  so that Abraham's mind should not reel under the sudden shock of God's command.

A Baraita interpreted  to teach that the whole eighth day is valid for circumcision, but deduced from Abraham's rising "early in the morning" to perform his obligations in  that the zealous perform circumcisions early in the morning.

A Tanna taught in the name of Rabbi Simeon ben Eleazar that intense love and hate can cause one to disregard the perquisites of one's social position. The Tanna deduced that love may do so from Abraham, for  reports that "Abraham rose early in the morning, and saddled his donkey," rather than allow his servant to do so. Similarly, the Tanna deduced that hate may do so from Balaam, for  reports that "Balaam rose up in the morning, and saddled his donkey," rather than allow his servant to do so.

Similarly, Rabbi Hiyya taught that it was an expression of love and encouragement. Rabbi Liezer taught that the repetition indicated that God spoke to Abraham and to future generations. Rabbi Liezer taught that there is no generation that does not contain people like Abraham, Jacob, Moses, and Samuel.

Reading , “And Abraham lifted up his eyes, and looked, and behold behind (ahar) him a ram caught in the thicket by his horns,” the Jerusalem Talmud asked what was the meaning of “behind (ahar)” which the Jerusalem Talmud read as “after.” Rabbi Judah the son of Rabbi Simon taught that it meant that Abraham saw prophetically that after generations, his descendants would be caught up in sins and entrapped in troubles. But in the end, they would be redeemed by the horn of this ram. As  says, “the Lord God will blow the horn, and will go with whirlwinds of the south.” And Rabbi Hunah taught in the name of Rabbi Hinenah bar Isaac that for that entire day, Abraham saw that the ram would get caught in one tree and free itself, get caught in a bush and free itself, and then get caught in a thicket and free itself. God told Abraham that this was how his descendants in the future would be caught by their sins and trapped by the kingdoms, from Babylonia to the Medes, from the Medes to Greece, from Greece to Edom (that is, Rome). Abraham asked God whether that was how it would be forever. And God replied that in the end, they would be redeemed by the horn of this ram. As  says, “the Lord God will blow the horn, and will go with whirlwinds of the south.” Similarly, noting that  reports that "Abraham lifted up his eyes, and looked, and behold behind him (ahar) a ram," a Midrash asked what "behind" (ahar) meant. Rabbi Judan taught that it meant after all that happened, Israel would still fall into the clutches of sin and thus become victims of persecution. But they would be ultimately redeemed by the ram's horn, as  says, "And the Lord God will blow the horn." Similarly, Rav Huna son of Rabbi Isaac read  to teach that God showed Abraham the ram tearing itself free from one thicket and getting entangled in another. God told Abraham that in a similar manner, Abraham's children would be caught by the nations and entangled in troubles, being dragged from empire to empire, from Babylon to Media, from Media to Greece, and from Greece to Edom (Rome), but they would ultimately be redeemed through the horns of the ram. And hence  says, "The Lord shall be seen over them, and His arrow shall go forth as the lightning; and the Lord God will blow the horn."

Rabbi Josiah taught in his father's name that God created the ram that  reports Abraham sacrificed in lieu of Isaac on the eve of the first Sabbath at twilight (indicating the miraculous nature of its appearance).

Some say the merit of Abraham's actions saved later Israelites.  reports that after David ordered a census of the Israelites, God punished the Israelites with a plague.  then reports, "And as He was about to destroy, the Lord beheld, and He repented Him." The Gemara asked what God beheld that caused God to withhold destruction. Samuel taught that God beheld the ashes of Isaac. (Thus God saw the merit of the sacrifice that Abraham intended to bring.) Alternatively, Rabbi Joḥanan taught that God saw the Temple. For  explained the meaning of the name that Abraham gave to the mountain where Abraham nearly sacrificed Isaac to be, "In the mount where the Lord is seen." (Solomon later built the Temple on that mountain, and God saw the merit of the sacrifices there.) Rabbi Jacob bar Iddi and Rabbi Samuel bar Nahmani differed on the matter. One said that God saw the atonement money that  reports God required Moses to collect from the Israelites, while the other said that God saw the Temple. The Gemara concluded that the more likely view was that God saw the Temple, as  can be read to say, "As it will be said on that day, 'in the mount where the Lord is seen.'"

Rabbi Abbahu taught that Jews sound a blast with a shofar made from a ram's horn on Rosh Hashanah, because God instructed them to do so to bring before God the memory of the binding of Isaac, in whose stead Abraham sacrificed a ram, and thus God will ascribe it to worshipers as if they had bound themselves before God. Rabbi Isaac asked why one sounds (tokin) a blast on Rosh Hashanah, and the Gemara answered that God states in  “Sound (tiku) a shofar.”

Abraham asked God that it might please God that when Isaac's descendants came to a time of trouble and would have no one to speak on their behalf, God would speak on their behalf. Rabbi Bibi argued that  alludes to Abraham's prayer when it says, “And Abraham called the name of that place ‘Adonai will see.’” Abraham prayed that when Isaac’s descendants would be distressed, God would be reminded of (and see) the binding of Isaac, their father, and have mercy on Isaac’s descendants.

The Mishnah taught that on public fasts when Israel was afflicted with drought, the Israelites would conclude a prayer with, “He Who answered Abraham on Mount Moriah [as reported in ], He shall answer you and hearken this day to the voice of your cry.”

God's promise to Abraham in  that God would multiply his children like the stars figures in a midrashic interpretation of the Plagues of Egypt. At first, he commanded the taskmasters to insist that the Israelites make the prescribed number of bricks. Then he commanded that the taskmasters not allow the Israelites to sleep in their homes, intending by this to limit their ability to have children. The taskmasters told the Israelites that if they went home to sleep, they would lose a few hours each morning from work and never complete the allotted number or bricks, as  reports: "And the taskmasters were urgent, saying: 'Fulfill your work.'" So the Israelites slept on the ground in the brickyard. God told the Egyptians that God had promised the Israelites' ancestor Abraham that God would multiply his children like the stars, as in  God promised Abraham: "That in blessing I will bless you, and in multiplying, I will multiply your seed as the stars of the heaven." But now the Egyptians were cunningly planning that the Israelites not increase. So God set about to see that God's word prevail, and immediately  reports: "But the more they afflicted them, the more they multiplied." When Pharaoh saw that the Israelites increased abundantly despite his decrees, he then decreed concerning the male children, as  reports: "And the king of Egypt spoke to the Hebrew midwives . . . and he said: 'When you do the office of a midwife to the Hebrew women, you shall look upon the birthstool: if it be a son, then you shall kill him.'" So finally (as  reports), "Pharaoh charged all his people, saying: 'Every son that is born you shall cast into the river.'"

Noting that  speaks of only Abraham when it says, "So Abraham returned to his young men," a Midrash asked: Where was Isaac? Rabbi Berekiah said in the name of the Rabbis of Babylon that Abraham sent Isaac to Shem to study Torah. The Midrash compared this to a woman who became wealthy through her spinning. She concluded that since she had become wealthy through her distaff, it would never leave her hand. Similarly, Abraham deduced that since all that had come to him was only because he engaged in Godly pursuits, he was unwilling that those should ever depart from his descendants. And Rabbi Jose the son of Rabbi Ḥaninah taught that Abraham sent Isaac home at night, for fear of the evil eye.

A Midrash told that at the very moment in  that the angel of the Lord stayed Abraham from sacrificing Isaac, the Satan appeared to Sarah in the guise of Isaac. When Sarah saw him, she asked what Abraham had done to him. He told Sarah that Abraham had taken him to a mountain, built an altar, placed wood upon it, tied him down on it, and took a knife to slaughter him, and had God not told him not to lay a hand on him, Abraham would have slaughtered him. And as soon as he finished speaking, Sarah's soul departed. Thus the Midrash deduced from the words "Abraham came to mourn for Sarah, and to weep for her" in  that Abraham came directly from Mount Moriah and the binding of Isaac.

Rabbi Berekiah observed that God never unites God's Name with a living person (to say, for example, "I am the God of Jacob," while they are alive) except with those who are experiencing suffering. (And thus Jacob referred to the God of Isaac instead of the God of Jacob.) And Rabbi Berekiah also observed that Isaac did indeed experience suffering. The Rabbis said that we look upon Isaac as if his ashes were heaped in a pile on the altar.

In medieval Jewish interpretation
The parashah is discussed in these medieval Jewish sources:

Genesis chapters 11–22
In their commentaries to Mishnah Avot 5:3 (see "In classical rabbinic interpretation" above), Rashi and Maimonides differed on what 10 trials Abraham faced:

Genesis chapter 18
Reading , "For I (God) have known him (Abraham), to the end that he may command his children and his household after him, that they may keep the way of the Lord, to do righteousness and justice," Baḥya ibn Paquda suggested that this points to how Israel's ancestors handed down the knowledge of God to their descendants. God thus identified God's self to the Israelites through the way that they gained knowledge of God.

Maimonides wrote that converts may say such declarations in the prescribed order and not change them in the least, and may bless and pray in the same way as every Jew by birth. Maimonides reasoned that Abraham taught the people, brought many under the wings of the Divine Presence, and ordered members of his household after him to keep God's ways forever. Ever since then, Maimonides taught, whoever adopts Judaism is counted among the disciples of Abraham. They are Abraham's household, and Abraham converted them to righteousness. In the same way that Abraham converted his contemporaries, he converts future generations through the testament that he left behind him. Thus Abraham is the father of his posterity who keep his ways and of all proselytes who adopt Judaism. Therefore, Maimonides counseled converts to pray, "God of our fathers," because Abraham is their father. Maimonides concluded that there is no difference between converts and born Jews. Both should say the blessing, "Who has chosen us," "Who has given us," "Who have taken us for Your own," and "Who has separated us"; for God has chosen converts and separated them from the nations and given them the Torah. For the Torah has been given to born Jews and proselytes alike, as  says, "One ordinance shall be both for you of the congregation, and also for the stranger that sojourns with you, an ordinance forever in your generations; as you are, so shall the stranger be before the Lord." Maimonides counseled converts not to consider their origin as inferior. While born Jews descend from Abraham, Isaac, and Jacob, converts derive from God, through whose word the world was created. As Isaiah said in  "One shall say, I am the Lord's, and another shall call himself by the name of Jacob."

The Midrash ha-Ne'lam (The Midrash of the Concealed) contrasted Abraham with Noah, noting that Noah did not shield his generation and did not pray for them as Abraham did for his. Abraham thought that there were ten in the city, counting Lot and his wife, his daughters and sons-in-law, and that is why he beseeched no further.

Genesis chapter 19

In modern interpretation
The parashah is discussed in these modern sources:

Genesis chapters 11–22
Umberto Cassuto identified the following chiastic structure in Abraham's 10 trials in 

A: "Go from your country . . ."; leave his father; blessings and promises
B: Sarai is in danger from Pharaoh; a sanctuary is founded at Bethel and the name of the Lord is proclaimed
C: Lot goes away
D: Lot is in jeopardy and is saved
E: Threat to the birth of the first-born; birth of Ishmael; covenant to be fulfilled through second son
E1: Covenant of circumcision; birth of Isaac foretold
D1: Lot is in jeopardy and is saved
C1: Sarah is in danger from Abimelech
B1: Hagar and Ishmael go away; a sanctuary is founded at Beersheba and the name of the Lord is proclaimed
A1: Go to the land of Moriah; bid farewell to his son; blessings and promises

John Van Seters argued that the Abraham cycle was a postexilic invention of the 5th century c.e. or later.

James Kugel wrote that over the last 100 years, scholarship has performed something of a zigzag about the historicity of Abraham. In the late 19th century, scholars were often skeptical of the Biblical account and believed that someone (the Jahwist or Elohist) who lived long after the Israelites had settled Canaan made up the Abrahamic stories to justify that settlement, to claim that although Israel's ancestor had arrived from a distant region, God had granted the land to Abraham. Then, early in the 20th century, archaeologists began turning up evidence that seemed to confirm, or at least coincide with, elements of the Genesis narrative, including evidence of Abraham's hometown, Ur; legal practices, customs, and a way of life that suited the Abrahamic narratives; the names of cities like Haran, Nahur, Terah, Peleg, and Serug mentioned in Genesis; the movement of people throughout the area in the late 18th century BCE; and documentation of adoptions of mature adults and wives like Eliezer and Sarah. In more recent times, however, this approach has come to be questioned, as scholars found that many of the stories contain elements (like the Philistines) from long after the time of Abraham; significant differences appear between the ancient texts and the Biblical passages they supposedly explained; and the absence of any reference to Abraham in the writings of Israel's 8th- and 7th-century prophets, who otherwise refer to Sodom and Gomorrah, Jacob and Esau, and the Exodus and Israel's desert wanderings, but do not mention Abraham until the 6th century or later. Seters argued that the Bible says that Abraham migrated from Babylon to Canaan to reflect the Jews' own "migration" from Babylon after having been exiled there in the 6th century. Kugel concluded that most scholars now concede that the Abrahamic stories contain some very ancient material arguably going back to the 10th or 11th century BCE, transmitted orally, and then transformed into the present, prose formulations at a time that remains the subject of debate.

Bright doubted that an author would have portrayed the revered ancestor as performing actions of this kind at a time when his readers would have regarded them as shocking. Bright concluded that the composition of the Jahwist source thus likely predated the Babylonian captivity, as the source so often depicted the Patriarchs as performing actions forbidden in Israelite law by the time of the exile.

Gary Rendsburg noted that Genesis often repeats the motif of the younger son. Rendsburg explained Genesis's interest with this motif by recalling that David was the youngest of Jesse’s seven sons (see ), and Solomon was among the youngest, if not the youngest, of David’s sons (see ). The issue of who among David’s many sons would succeed him dominates the Succession Narrative in  through . The two remaining candidates were Adonijah (David’s fourth son) and Solomon, and although Adonijah was older (and once claimed the throne when David was old and feeble in ), Solomon won out. Rendsburg argued that even though firstborn royal succession was the norm in the ancient Near East, the authors of Genesis justified Solomonic rule by imbedding the notion of ultimogeniture into Genesis’s national epic. An Israelite could thus not criticize David’s selection of Solomon to succeed him as king over Israel, because Genesis reported that God had favored younger sons since Abel and blessed younger sons of Israel — Isaac, Jacob, Judah, Joseph, Perez, and Ephraim — since the inception of the covenant. More generally, Rendsburg concluded that royal scribes living in Jerusalem during the reigns of David and Solomon in the tenth century BCE were responsible for Genesis; their ultimate goal was to justify the monarchy in general, and the kingship of David and Solomon in particular; and Genesis thus appears as a piece of political propaganda.

Genesis chapter 18

Genesis chapter 19
To Hermann Gunkel, the expression "even to this day" in  revealed that a great interval of time lay between the period of the Patriarchs and that of the narrators of Genesis.

Rendsburg read in  — which portrays the nations of Moab and Ammon, Transjordanian states ruled by David and Solomon, as descendants of the sons of Lot (and thus the grandnephews of Abraham) — to indicate that the author of Genesis sought to portray the ancestors of these countries as related to the patriarchs in order to justify Israelite rule over them. Rendsburg noted that during the United Monarchy, Israel governed the most firmly the nations geographically closest to Israel; 2 Samuel reports that Israel held the native kings of Moab and Ammon to rule as tributary vassals.

Genesis chapter 20
Reading the three instances of the wife-sister motif in (a) ; (b) ; and (c) , Ephraim Speiser argued that in a work by a single author, these three cases would present serious contradictions: Abraham would have learned nothing from his narrow escape in Egypt, and so tried the same ruse in Gerar; and Abimelech would have been so little sobered by his perilous experience with Abraham and Sarah that he fell into the identical trap with Isaac and Rebekah. Speiser concluded (on independent grounds) that the Jahwist was responsible for incidents (a) and (c), while the Elohist was responsible for incident (b). If the Elohist had been merely an annotator of the Jahwist, however, the Elohist would still have seen the contradictions for Abimelech, a man of whom the Elohist clearly approved. Speiser concluded that the Jahwist and the Elohist therefore must have worked independently.

Genesis chapter 22
Jean Astruc, one of the founding fathers of the Documentary Hypothesis, saw in the narrative of the Binding of Isaac a Document A —  — and a Document B — .

Rendsburg also noted that  contains a concentration of key words that begin with the consonants yod (y) and resh (r), the letters that begin the word “Jerusalem” (Yerushalayim). Rendsburg noted further that  refers to “the land of Moriah,” and this word occurs in the Bible in only one other place,  “Solomon began to build the Temple of YHVH in Jerusalem on Mount Moriah, which appeared to David his father, and which David had prepared as the place, at the threshing floor of Ornan (a variant of Araunah) the Jebusite.” This passage indicates that by the Persian period, Jewish readers had identified Moriah with Jerusalem. Rendsburg argued that the message would have been clear to Israelites living in Solomon's time that even though altars stood throughout the countryside, and some may even have been as old as Abraham, the only place where Abraham actually sacrificed was the mount of the Lord — Jerusalem — and that was why only the Jerusalem Temple was approved for sacrifices to God.

In , God promised that the Abraham's descendants would as numerous as the stars of heaven and the sands on the seashore. Carl Sagan reported that there are more stars in the universe than sands on all the beaches on the Earth.

Commandments
According to Maimonides and Sefer ha-Chinuch, there are no commandments in the parashah.

As the sages read , "And the Lord appeared to him [Abraham] by the terebinths of Mamre" (when Abraham was still recovering from his circumcision in ) to report that God visited Abraham when Abraham was ill, the Kitzur Shulchan Aruch teaches that everyone is obligated to visit a person who becomes ill.

In the liturgy

The Haggadah recounts that Abraham ran to the herd.

 is the Torah reading for the first day of Rosh Hashanah, and the traditional Rosh Hashanah prayerbook (machzor) includes a liturgical poem (piyyut) attributed to Rabbi Eleazar ben Kalir based on  noting that God remembered Sarah on Rosh Hashanah. In its responsum supporting the inclusion of the Matriarchs in the first blessing of the Amidah prayer, the Committee on Jewish Law and Standards of Conservative Judaism cited the Rosh Hashanah Torah reading for the proposition that the liturgy had already recognized the Matriarch’s role in the covenant between God and Jews.

The 16th century Safed Rabbi Eliezer Azikri drew on this rabbinic understanding to call for God to show mercy for Abraham's descendants, "the son of Your beloved" (ben ohavach), in his kabbalistic poem Yedid Nefesh ("Soul's Beloved"), which many congregations chant just before the Kabbalat Shabbat prayer service.

Many Jews, following Kabbalistic masters from the Zohar to Arizal, recite , the binding of Isaac, after the morning blessings (Birkat HaShachar). The recitation of Abraham's and Isaac's willingness to put God above life itself is meant to invoke God's mercy, to inspire worshipers to greater love of God, and to bring atonement to the penitent.

And many Jews recall God's answering Abraham on Mount Moriah and God's answering his son Isaac when he was bound on top of the altar (as reported in ) as they recite some of the final piyutim that they say each day in penitential Selichot prayers leading up to the High Holy Days.

Haftarah
A haftarah is a text selected from the books of Nevi'im ("The Prophets") that is read publicly in the synagogue after the reading of the Torah on Sabbath and holiday mornings. The haftarah usually has a thematic link to the Torah reading that precedes it.

The specific text read following Parashah Vayeira varies according to different traditions within Judaism. Examples are:

for Ashkenazi Jews: 2 Kings 
for Sephardi Jews: 
for Karaite Jews: –

The parashah and haftarah in 2 Kings both tell of God's gift of sons to childless women. In both the parashah and the haftarah: God's representative visits the childless woman, whose household extends the visitor generous hospitality; the husband's age raises doubt about the couple's ability to have children; God's representative announces that a child will come at a specified season in the next year; the woman conceives and bears a child as God's representative had announced; death threatens the promised child; and God's representative intervenes to save the promised child.

See also
Binding of Isaac
Hājar
Wife–sister narratives in the Book of Genesis

Notes

Further reading
The parashah has parallels or is discussed in these sources:

Ancient
Code of Hammurabi 170–171. Circa 1780 BCE.

Biblical
 (God's destruction in the flood); ;  (numerous as stars); .
 (abandoned infant);  (God's destruction of Egypt's firstborn); ; .
 (rose up in the morning, and saddled his ass, and his two servants were with him).
 (numerous as stars).
; .
; ; .
 (nothing too hard for God).
 (God's destruction of Jerusalem's sinners);  (abandoned infant);  (Sodom); .

Early nonrabbinic
Euripides. Iphigeneia at Aulis. 410 BCE.
Philo the Epic Poet. On Jerusalem. Fragment 2. 3rd–2nd century BCE. Quoted in Eusebius. Preparation for the Gospel. 9:20:1. Translated by H. Attridge. In The Old Testament Pseudepigrapha: Volume 2: Expansions of the "Old Testament" and Legends, Wisdom and Philosophical Literature, Prayers, Psalms, and Odes, Fragments of Lost Judeo-Hellenistic works. Edited by James H. Charlesworth, page 783. New York: Anchor Bible, 1985. (binding of Isaac).
Jubilees 17:1–18:19. Land of Israel, 2nd century BCE. In, e.g., The Book of Jubilees or the Little Genesis. Translated by Robert H. Charles. London: Black, 1902. In, e.g., The Book of Jubilees: Translation of Early Jewish and Palestinian Texts. Lexington, Kentucky: Forgotten Books, 2007.
Virgil. Georgics 4:456. 37–30 BCE. (Orpheus and Eurydice.)
Apocalypse of Abraham. Circa 70–150 CE. Translated by R. Rubinkiewicz. In The Old Testament Pseudepigrapha: Volume 1: Apocalyptic Literature and Testaments. Edited by James H. Charlesworth, pages 681–705. New York: Anchor Bible, 1983.
Testament of Abraham. Circa 1st or 2nd century CE. Translated by E. P. Sanders. In The Old Testament Pseudepigrapha: Volume 1: Apocalyptic Literature and Testaments. Edited by James H. Charlesworth, pages 871–902. New York: Anchor Bible, 1983.
Josephus. Antiquities, 1:10:5 ; 1:11:1–4 ; 1:12:1–4 ; 1:13:1–4 . Circa 93–94. In, e.g., The Works of Josephus: Complete and Unabridged, New Updated Edition. Translated by William Whiston. Peabody, Massachusetts: Hendrickson Publishers, 1987.
4 Maccabees 13:11–12; 16:18–20.
Epistle of Barnabas 7:3–4.
Hebrews 11:11–19.

James 2:20–24.
Qur'an 2:124–32; 11:69–83; 15:51–79; 29:31–35; 37:99–113; 51:24–37; 53:53–54; 69:9–10. Arabia, 7th century.

Classical rabbinic
Mishnah: Mishnah Shabbat 16:1; Yevamot 8:3; Bava Kamma 8:7; Sanhedrin 10:5; Avot 5:3, 6, 10. 3rd century. In, e.g., The Mishnah: A New Translation. Translated by Jacob Neusner, pages 198, 355, 522, 606, 685, 687. New Haven: Yale University Press, 1988.
Tosefta: Berakhot 1:15; Maaser Sheni 5:29; Rosh Hashanah 2:13; Taanit 2:13; Megillah 3:6; Sotah 4:1–6, 12, 5:12, 6:1, 6; Bava Kamma 9:29; Sanhedrin 14:4. Circa 250. In, e.g., The Tosefta: Translated from the Hebrew, with a New Introduction. Translated by Jacob Neusner. Peabody, Massachusetts: Hendrickson Publishers, 2002.
Sifre to Deuteronomy 2:3; 49:1. In, e.g., Sifre to Deuteronomy. Translated by Jacob Neusner, volume 1, pages 26, 164. Atlanta: Scholars Press, 1987.
Jerusalem Talmud: Berakhot 4b–5a, 43a–b; Peah 8b; Yoma 18a; Rosh Hashanah 9b; Taanit 12a, 29a; Megillah 31b; Yevamot 63b; Ketubot 75a, 77b; Nedarim 12a; Sotah 28b, 31b; Kiddushin 1b; Bava Kamma 32b; Bava Metzia 13b; Sanhedrin 62a, 70a; Avodah Zarah 7b. Tiberias, Land of Israel, circa 400 CE. In, e.g., Talmud Yerushalmi. Edited by Chaim Malinowitz, Yisroel Simcha Schorr, and Mordechai Marcus, volumes 1, 3, 21, 24–26, 30, 32–33, 36–37, 40–42, 45, 47. Brooklyn: Mesorah Publications, 2005–2020. And in, e.g., The Jerusalem Talmud: A Translation and Commentary. Edited by Jacob Neusner and translated by Jacob Neusner, Tzvee Zahavy, B. Barry Levy, and Edward Goldman. Peabody, Massachusetts: Hendrickson Publishers, 2009. 
Genesis Rabbah 8:13; 18:2, 5; 20:6; 26:5; 27:3; 28:5; 38:14; 39:6, 9, 11, 16; 40:1; 41:3–4; 42:8; 43:8; 44:2, 12; 45:4–5, 10; 47:1; 48:1–57:4; 58:2; 59:1, 5; 61:1, 4; 63:7; 64:3; 65:10, 19; 67:9; 68:7, 9, 12; 74:7; 78:8; 80:5; 93:7; 94:4–5; 95:3; 95 (MSV); 100:9. Land of Israel, 5th century. In, e.g., Midrash Rabbah: Genesis. Translated by Harry Freedman and Maurice Simon, volume 1, pages 63, 141–44, 163–64, 213–14, 221, 226, 311–12, 315, 318–19, 325–26, 334–35, 351, 357–58, 361–62, 367–68, 381–83, 387, 399, 405–508; volume 2, pages 510, 516, 518, 540, 543, 561, 574, 585–86, 594, 613, 620–21, 627, 681, 720, 738, 866, 871–73, 883, 918, 1000. London: Soncino Press, 1939.
Babylonian Talmud: Berakhot 26b–27a, 29a, 56b, 62b; Shabbat 10b–11a, 127a; [https://www.sefaria.org/Pesachim.4a.6 Pesachim 4a, 54a, 88a, 119b; Yoma 28b, 38b; Rosh Hashanah 11a, 16b; Taanit 8a–b, 16a; Megillah 14a, 28a, 31a; Moed Katan 16b; Yevamot 63a, 65b, 76b–77a, 79a; Ketubot 8b; Nedarim 31a; Nazir 23b; Sotah 9b–10b, 14a; Kiddushin 29a; Bava Kamma 92a, 93a; Bava Metzia 86b–87a; Sanhedrin 89b, 105b, 109a–b; Shevuot 35b; Chullin 60b (Sasanian Empire, 6th century), in, e.g., Talmud Bavli. Edited by Yisroel Simcha Schorr, Chaim Malinowitz, and Mordechai Marcus, 72 volumes. Brooklyn: Mesorah Pubs., 2006.

Medieval
Solomon ibn Gabirol. A Crown for the King, 7:67. Spain, 11th century. Translated by David R. Slavitt, pages 10–11. New York: Oxford University Press, 1998.
Rashi. Commentary. Genesis 18–22. Troyes, France, late 11th century. In, e.g., Rashi. The Torah: With Rashi's Commentary Translated, Annotated, and Elucidated. Translated and annotated by Yisrael Isser Zvi Herczeg, volume 1, pages 173–240. Brooklyn: Mesorah Publications, 1995.

Rashbam. Commentary on the Torah. Troyes, early 12th century. In, e.g., Rabbi Samuel Ben Meir's Commentary on Genesis: An Annotated Translation. Translated by Martin I. Lockshin, pages 58–100. Lewiston, New York: The Edwin Mellen Press, 1989.
Judah Halevi. Kuzari. 2:14, 80; 5:20. Toledo, Spain, 1130–1140. In, e.g., Jehuda Halevi. Kuzari: An Argument for the Faith of Israel. Introduction by Henry Slonimsky, pages 91, 130–31, 282–83. New York: Schocken, 1964.
Abraham ibn Ezra. Commentary on the Torah. Mid-12th century. In, e.g., Ibn Ezra's Commentary on the Pentateuch: Genesis (Bereshit). Translated and annotated by H. Norman Strickman and Arthur M. Silver, pages 189–227. New York: Menorah Publishing Company, 1988.
Ephraim ben Jacob of Bonn. The Akedah. Bonn, circa 1200. In Shalom Spiegel and Judah Goldin. The Last Trial: On the Legends and Lore of the Command to Abraham to Offer Isaac as a Sacrifice: The Akedah. Jewish Lights: 1993.

Hezekiah ben Manoah. Hizkuni. France, circa 1240. In, e.g., Chizkiyahu ben Manoach. Chizkuni: Torah Commentary. Translated and annotated by Eliyahu Munk, volume 1, pages 131–65. Jerusalem: Ktav Publishers, 2013.
Nachmanides. Commentary on the Torah. Jerusalem, circa 1270. In, e.g., Ramban (Nachmanides): Commentary on the Torah: Genesis. Translated by Charles B. Chavel, volume 1, pages 226–80. New York: Shilo Publishing House, 1971.

Midrash ha-Ne'lam (The Midrash of the Concealed). Spain, 13th century. In, e.g., Zohar, part 1, pages 97a–118a. Mantua, 1558–1560. In, e.g., The Zohar: Pritzker Edition. Translation and commentary by Nathan Wolski, volume 10, pages 316–65. Stanford, California: Stanford University Press, 2016.
Zohar volume 1, pages 97a–120b. Spain, late 13th century.
Bahya ben Asher. Commentary on the Torah. Spain, early 14th century. In, e.g., Midrash Rabbeinu Bachya: Torah Commentary by Rabbi Bachya ben Asher. Translated and annotated by Eliyahu Munk, volume 1, pages 276–346. Jerusalem: Lambda Publishers, 2003.
Isaac ben Moses Arama. Akedat Yizhak (The Binding of Isaac). Late 15th century. In, e.g., Yitzchak Arama. Akeydat Yitzchak: Commentary of Rabbi Yitzchak Arama on the Torah. Translated and condensed by Eliyahu Munk, volume 1, pages 125–59. New York, Lambda Publishers, 2001.

Modern
Isaac Abravanel. Commentary on the Torah. Italy, between 1492 and 1509. In, e.g., Abarbanel: Selected Commentaries on the Torah: Volume 1: Bereishis/Genesis. Translated and annotated by Israel Lazar, pages 104–28. Brooklyn: CreateSpace, 2015. And excerpted in, e.g., Abarbanel on the Torah: Selected Themes. Translated by Avner Tomaschoff, pages 289–321. Jerusalem: Jewish Agency for Israel, 2007.
Obadiah ben Jacob Sforno. Commentary on the Torah. Venice, 1567. In, e.g., Sforno: Commentary on the Torah. Translation and explanatory notes by Raphael Pelcovitz, pages 86–113. Brooklyn: Mesorah Publications, 1997.
Moshe Alshich. Commentary on the Torah. Safed, circa 1593. In, e.g., Moshe Alshich. Midrash of Rabbi Moshe Alshich on the Torah. Translated and annotated by Eliyahu Munk, volume 1, pages 115–45. New York, Lambda Publishers, 2000.

Avraham Yehoshua Heschel. Commentaries on the Torah. Cracow, Poland, mid 17th century. Compiled as Chanukat HaTorah. Edited by Chanoch Henoch Erzohn. Piotrkow, Poland, 1900. In Avraham Yehoshua Heschel. Chanukas HaTorah: Mystical Insights of Rav Avraham Yehoshua Heschel on Chumash. Translated by Avraham Peretz Friedman, pages 53–64. Southfield, Michigan: Targum Press/Feldheim Publishers, 2004.
Thomas Hobbes. Leviathan, 3:34, 36, 38, 40, 42. England, 1651. Reprint edited by C. B. Macpherson, pages 436–37, 456–57, 460, 486, 500–01, 584–85. Harmondsworth, England: Penguin Classics, 1982.
Baruch Spinoza. Theologico-Political Treatise, chapters 1, 2, 8. Amsterdam, 1670. In, e.g., Baruch Spinoza. Theological-Political Treatise. Translated by Samuel Shirley, pages 11, 28, 107. Indianapolis: Hackett Publishing Company, second edition, 2001.

Chaim ibn Attar. Ohr ha-Chaim. Venice, 1742. In Chayim ben Attar. Or Hachayim: Commentary on the Torah. Translated by Eliyahu Munk, volume 1, pages 157–84. Brooklyn: Lambda Publishers, 1999.
Immanuel Kant. The Conflict of the Faculties. Translated by Mary J. Gregor, page 115. New York: Abaris, 1979. Repr. Lincoln: University of Nebraska Press, 1992. Translation of Der Streit Der Fakultäten. Königsberg: Friedrich Nicolovius, 1798.
Søren Kierkegaard. Fear and Trembling. 1843. Reprint, London: Penguin Classics, 1986.
Henry Wadsworth Longfellow The Jewish Cemetery at Newport. Boston, 1854. In Harold Bloom. American Religious Poems, pages 80–81. New York: Library of America, 2006.
Nathaniel Parker Willis. "Hagar in the Wilderness." Cosmopolitan Art Journal, volume 3 (number 3) (June 1859) : pages 107–08.

Samuel David Luzzatto (Shadal). Commentary on the Torah. Padua, 1871. In, e.g., Samuel David Luzzatto. Torah Commentary. Translated and annotated by Eliyahu Munk, volume 1, pages 176–216. New York: Lambda Publishers, 2012.
Emily Dickinson. Poem 504 (You know that Portrait in the Moon —); Poem 1317 (Abraham to kill him —). Circa 1874. In The Complete Poems of Emily Dickinson. Edited by Thomas H. Johnson, pages 245, 571–72. New York: Little, Brown & Co., 1960.
Edwin Cone Bissell. "Is Genesis 21:9–21 a Duplicate of Genesis 16:5–14?" The Biblical World, volume 2 (number 6) (December 1893): pages 407–11.

Hermann Gunkel. "The Two Accounts of Hagar (Genesis xvi. and xxi., 8–21.)." The Monist, volume 10 (number 3) (April 1900): pages 321–42.
Yehudah Aryeh Leib Alter. Sefat Emet. Góra Kalwaria (Ger), Poland, before 1906. Excerpted in The Language of Truth: The Torah Commentary of Sefat Emet. Translated and interpreted by Arthur Green, pages 27–32. Philadelphia: Jewish Publication Society, 1998. Reprinted 2012.

Hermann Cohen. Religion of Reason: Out of the Sources of Judaism. Translated with an introduction by Simon Kaplan; introductory essays by Leo Strauss, pages 118, 431. New York: Ungar, 1972. Reprinted Atlanta: Scholars Press, 1995. Originally published as Religion der Vernunft aus den Quellen des Judentums. Leipzig: Gustav Fock, 1919.
Wilfred Owen. The Parable of the Old Man and the Young. 1920. In The Collected Poems of Wilfred Owen. Edited by C. Day-Lewis, page 42. New York: New Directions Publishing, 1965.

James Joyce. Ulysses, chapter 4 (Calypso). Paris: Sylvia Beach, 1922. (“Brimstone they called it raining down: the cities of the plain: Sodom, Gomorrah, Edom. All dead names. A dead sea in a dead land, grey and old. Old now. It bore the oldest, the first race. A bent hag crossed from Cassidy's, clutching a naggin bottle by the neck. The oldest people. Wandered far away over all the earth, captivity to captivity, multiplying, dying, being born everywhere. It lay there now. Now it could bear no more.”).
Alexander Alan Steinbach. Sabbath Queen: Fifty-four Bible Talks to the Young Based on Each Portion of the Pentateuch, pages 11–14. New York: Behrman's Jewish Book House, 1936.
Thomas Mann. Joseph and His Brothers. Translated by John E. Woods, pages 9, 54, 79–82, 91, 97–98, 141, 147–49, 152–55, 159–60, 227–28, 294, 347, 363–64, 386, 400, 425, 471, 474–75, 488, 498, 520–22, 693, 715–16, 748, 806. New York: Alfred A. Knopf, 2005. Originally published as Joseph und seine Brüder. Stockholm: Bermann-Fischer Verlag, 1943.
Anne Frank. The Diary of a Young Girl: The Definitive Edition. Edited by Otto H. Frank and Mirjam Pressler; translated by Susan Massotty, page 294. New York: Doubleday, 1995. Originally published as Het Achterhuis. The Netherlands, 1947. ("And what do they mean by [the guilt of] Sodom and Gomorah.")
Shalom Spiegel. The Last Trial: On the Legends and Lore of the Command to Abraham to Offer Isaac as a Sacrifice: The Akedah. New York: Schocken Books, 1969; reprinted Woodstock, Vermont: Jewish Lights, 1993. Originally published as Me-agadot ha-akedah. New York: Jewish Theological Seminary, 1950.

Erich Auerbach. "Odysseus' Scar." In Mimesis: The Representation of Reality in Western Literature, chapter 1. Istanbul, 1942–1945. Bern: A. Francke. Reprinted Princeton, New Jersey, Princeton University Press, 1953. New Expanded edition, 2013.
Benjamin Britten. Canticle II: Abraham and Isaac, Op. 51. 1952.
Louis Armstrong. "Aunt Hagar's Blues." In Louis Armstrong Plays W.C. Handy. Columbia Records, 1954.

Morris Adler. The World of the Talmud, page 94. B'nai B'rith Hillel Foundations, 1958. Reprinted Kessinger Publishing, 2007.

Bernard Malamud. “The Lady of the Lake.” In Bernard Malamud. The Magic Barrel. New York: Farrar, Straus and Giroux, 1958. And reprinted in Bernard Malamud. The Complete Stories. New York: Farrar, Straus and Giroux, 1997. (a woman turns to stone after the protagonist denies his Jewishness).
Anda Pinkerfeld-'Amir. "Hagar." Poetry, volume 92 (number 4) (July 1958): pages 232–34.
Walter Orenstein and Hertz Frankel. Torah and Tradition: A Bible Textbook for Jewish Youth: Volume I: Bereishis, pages 38–51. New York: Hebrew Publishing Company, 1964.
Bob Dylan. "Highway 61 Revisited." In Highway 61 Revisited Columbia Records, 1965.

Delmore Schwartz. "For the One Who Would Not Take His Life in His Hands," "Abraham," and "Sarah." In Selected Poems: Summer Knowledge, pages 55, 230–32. New York: New Directions, 1967.
Martin Buber. On the Bible: Eighteen studies, pages 22–43. New York: Schocken Books, 1968.
Mitchell J. Dahood. "The Name yišmā'ēl in Genesis 20,11." Biblica, volume 49 (1968): pages 87–88.
Kurt Vonnegut. Slaughterhouse-Five, or The Children's Crusade: A Duty-Dance With Death, pages 21–22. New York: Dell, 1968.
Israel W. Charny. "And Abraham Went to Slay Isaac: A Parable of Killer, Victim, and Bystander in the Family of Man." Journal of Ecumenical Studies, volume 10 (number 2) (1973): pages 304–18.
George W. Coats. "Abraham's Sacrifice of Faith: A Form–Critical Study of Genesis 22." Interpretation, volume 27 (1973): pages 389–400.
James Crenshaw. "Journey into Oblivion: A Structural Analysis of Gen. 22:1–19." Soundings, volume 58 (1975): pages 243–56.

Samuel Greengus. "Sisterhood Adoption at Nuzi and the 'Wife-Sister' in Genesis." Hebrew Union College Annual, volume 46 (1975): pages 5–31.
Sean E. McEvenue. "A Comparison of Narrative Styles in the Hagar Stories." Semeia, volume 3 (1975): pages 64–80.
Seän M. Warner. “The Patriarchs and Extra-Biblical Sources.” Journal for the Study of the Old Testament, volume 1, number 2 (June 1976): pages 50–61.
J. Maxwell Miller. “The Patriarchs and Extra-Biblical Sources: a Response.” Journal for the Study of the Old Testament, volume 1, number 2 (June 1976): pages 62–66.
Elie Wiesel. "The Sacrifice of Isaac: a Survivor's Story." In Messengers of God: Biblical Portraits & Legends, pages 69–102. New York: Random House, 1976.
John Tracy Luke. “Abraham and the Iron Age: Reflections on the New Patriarchal Studies.” Journal for the Study of the Old Testament, volume 2, number 4 (February 1977): pages 35–47.
Philip R. Davies and Bruce D. Chilton. "The Aqedah: A Revised Tradition History." Catholic Biblical Quarterly, volume 40 (1978): pages 514–46.
Donald J. Wiseman. "They Lived in Tents." In Biblical and Near Eastern Studies: Essays in Honor of William Sanford La Sor. Edited by Gary A. Tuttle, pages 195–200. Grand Rapids, Michigan: Eerdmans, 1978.
David C. Hopkins. "Between Promise and Fulfillment: von Rad and the 'Sacrifice of Abraham.'" Biblische Zeitschrift, volume 24 (number 2) (1980): pages 180–93.
Nehama Leibowitz. Studies in Bereshit (Genesis), pages 158–206. Jerusalem: The World Zionist Organization, 1981. Reprinted as New Studies in the Weekly Parasha. Lambda Publishers, 2010.
Joseph Blenkinsopp. "Abraham and the Righteous of Sodom." Journal of Jewish Studies, volume 33 (1982): pages 119–32.
Walter Brueggemann. Genesis: Interpretation: A Bible Commentary for Teaching and Preaching, pages 150–94. Atlanta: John Knox Press, 1982.
Harold Fisch. “Ruth and the Structure of Covenant History.” Vetus Testamentum, volume 32, number 4 (October 1982): pages 425–37.
Sebastian Brock. "Genesis 22: Where Was Sarah?" Expository Times, volume 96 (1984): pages 14–17.
Phyllis Trible. "Hagar: The Desolation of Rejection." In Texts of Terror: Literary-Feminist Readings of Biblical Narratives, pages 9–35. Philadelphia: Fortress Press, 1984.

George W. Coats. "Lot: A Foil in the Abraham Saga." In Understanding the Word: Essays in Honor of Bernhard W. Anderson. Edited by James T. Butler, Edgar W. Conrad, and Ben C. Ollenburger, pages 113–32. Sheffield: JSOT Press, 1985.
Robert Alter. “Sodom as Nexus: The Web of Design in Biblical Narrative.” Tikkun, volume 1, number 1 (Spring 1986).
Pinchas H. Peli. Torah Today: A Renewed Encounter with Scripture, pages 15–19. Washington, D.C.: B'nai B'rith Books, 1987.
Adin Steinsaltz. "Abraham." In The Strife of the Spirit, pages 127–33. Northvale, New Jersey: Jason Aronson, 1988.
Nahum M. Sarna. The JPS Torah Commentary: Genesis: The Traditional Hebrew Text with the New JPS Translation, pages 128–57, 387–94. Philadelphia: Jewish Publication Society, 1989.
Mark E. Biddle. "The 'Endangered Ancestress' and Blessing for the Nations." Journal of Biblical Literature, volume 109 (number 4) (Winter 1990): pages 599–611.
Alice Miller. "When Isaac Arises from the Sacrificial Altar." In The Touched Key: Tracing Childhood Trauma in Creativity and Destructiveness. Translated by Hildegarde and Hunter Hannum, pages 137–45. Anchor Books/Doubleday, 1990.
Mark S. Smith. The Early History of God: Yahweh and the Other Deities in Ancient Israel, pages 10, 81, 132, 135. New York: HarperSanFrancisco, 1990.
Pat Barker. Regeneration, pages 149–50. New York: Dutton, 1992.
Charles Oberndorf. Testing. New York: Spectra, 1993.
Pat Schneider. Sarah Laughed. In Long Way Home: Poems, pages 46–47. Amherst, Massachusetts: Amherst Writers and Artists Press, 1993.
Aaron Wildavsky. Assimilation versus Separation: Joseph the Administrator and the Politics of Religion in Biblical Israel, pages 5–6, 15, 17–29. New Brunswick, N.J.: Transaction Publishers, 1993.
Leon R. Kass. “Educating Father Abraham: The Meaning of Fatherhood.” First Things, volume 48 (December 1994): pages 32–43.
Joseph B. Soloveitchik. Abraham's Journey. KTAV Publishing House, 2008. (written before 1994).
Judith S. Antonelli. "Edith: Pillar of Salt." In In the Image of God: A Feminist Commentary on the Torah, pages 39–47. Northvale, New Jersey: Jason Aronson, 1995.
Jon D. Levenson. The Death and Resurrection of the Beloved Son: The Transformation of Child Sacrifice in Judaism and Christianity. Yale University Press, 1995. (binding of Isaac).
Naomi H. Rosenblatt and Joshua Horwitz. Wrestling With Angels: What Genesis Teaches Us About Our Spiritual Identity, Sexuality, and Personal Relationships, pages 158–203. Delacorte Press, 1995.
Joshua Schwartz. "Ishmael at Play: On Exegesis and Jewish Society." Hebrew Union College Annual, volume 66 (1995): pages 203–21.
Avivah Gottlieb Zornberg. The Beginning of Desire: Reflections on Genesis, pages 97–122. New York: Image Books/Doubelday, 1995.
Ellen Frankel. The Five Books of Miriam: A Woman's Commentary on the Torah, pages 22–30. New York: G. P. Putnam's Sons, 1996.

W. Gunther Plaut. The Haftarah Commentary, pages 33–43. New York: UAHC Press, 1996.
Sorel Goldberg Loeb and Barbara Binder Kadden. Teaching Torah: A Treasury of Insights and Activities, pages 25–32. Denver: A.R.E. Publishing, 1997.
Thomas B. Dozeman. "The Wilderness and Salvation History in the Hagar Story." Journal of Biblical Literature, volume 117 (number 1) (Spring 1998): pages 23–43.
Susan Freeman. Teaching Jewish Virtues: Sacred Sources and Arts Activities, pages 8–25, 55–68, 102–18, 228–54, 283–98. Springfield, New Jersey: A.R.E. Publishing, 1999. (12–14, 21, 27, 32).
Cynthia A. Culpeper. "Positive Pillars." In The Women's Torah Commentary: New Insights from Women Rabbis on the 54 Weekly Torah Portions. Edited by Elyse Goldstein, pages 63–69. Woodstock, Vermont: Jewish Lights Publishing, 2000.
Tamara Goshen-Gottstein. “The Souls that They Made: Physical Infertility and Spiritual Fecundity.” In Torah of the Mothers: Contemporary Jewish Women Read Classical Jewish Texts. Edited by Ora Wiskind Elper and Susan Handelman, pages 123–54. New York and Jerusalem: Urim Publications, 2000..
John S. Kselman. "Genesis." In The HarperCollins Bible Commentary. Edited by James L. Mays, pages 94–96. New York: HarperCollins Publishers, revised edition, 2000.

Israel Finkelstein and Neil Asher Silberman. "Searching for the Patriarchs." In The Bible Unearthed: Archaeology's New Vision of Ancient Israel and the Origin of Its Sacred Texts, pages 27–47. New York: The Free Press, 2001.
Scott Nikaido. "Hagar and Ishmael as Literary Figures: An Intertextual Study." Vetus Testamentum, volume 51 (number 2) (April 2001): pages 219–42.
Shlomith Yaron. “Sperm Stealing: A moral crime by three of David’s ancestresses.” Bible Review, volume 17, number 1 (February 2001): pages 34–38, 44. (Lot's daughters)</ref>
Lainie Blum Cogan and Judy Weiss. Teaching Haftarah: Background, Insights, and Strategies, pages 183–91. Denver: A.R.E. Publishing, 2002.
John Kaltner. "Abraham's Sons: How the Bible and Qur'an See the Same Story Differently." Bible Review, volume 18 (number 2) (April 2002): pages 16–23, 45–46.
Michael Fishbane. The JPS Bible Commentary: Haftarot, pages 23–29. Philadelphia: Jewish Publication Society, 2002.
Tikva Frymer-Kensky. "The Hand that Rocks the Cradle: The Rivka Stories," "The Disposable Wife," and "Hagar, My Other, My Self." In Reading the Women of the Bible, pages 5–23, 93–98, 225–37. New York: Schocken Books, 2002.
Vocolot. "Sarah and Hagar." In HeartBeat. Berkeley: Oyster Albums, 2002.
Gershon Hepner. "Abraham's Incestuous Marriage with Sarah a Violation of the Holiness Code." Vetus Testamentum, volume 53 (number 2) (April 2003): pages 143–55.
Alan Lew. This Is Real and You Are Completely Unprepared: The Days of Awe as a Journey of Transformation, page 122. Boston: Little, Brown and Co., 2003. (the Rosh Hashanah readings).
Elie Wiesel. "Ishmael and Hagar" and "Lot's Wife." In Wise Men and Their Tales: Portraits of Biblical, Talmudic, and Hasidic Masters, pages 3–28. New York: Schocken, 2003.
Robert Alter. The Five Books of Moses: A Translation with Commentary, pages 85–112. New York: W.W. Norton & Co., 2004.
Jon D. Levenson. "Genesis." In The Jewish Study Bible. Edited by Adele Berlin and Marc Zvi Brettler, pages 39–47. New York: Oxford University Press, 2004.
Anthony Hecht. Lot's Wife. In Collected Later Poems, page 192. New York: Knopf, 2005.
Professors on the Parashah: Studies on the Weekly Torah Reading Edited by Leib Moscovitz, pages 36–46. Jerusalem: Urim Publications, 2005.
Aaron Wildavsky. Moses as Political Leader, pages 133–36. Jerusalem: Shalem Press, 2005.
Nachman Levine. “Sarah/Sodom: Birth, Destruction, and Synchronic Transaction.” Journal for the Study of the Old Testament, volume 31 (number 2) (December 2006): pages 131–46.
Barack Obama. The Audacity of Hope, page 220. New York: Three Rivers Press, 2006.
W. Gunther Plaut. The Torah: A Modern Commentary: Revised Edition. Revised edition edited by David E.S. Stern, pages 121–52. New York: Union for Reform Judaism, 2006.
David Rosenberg. Abraham: The First Historical Biography. New York: Basic Books, 2006.
Rosanna Warren. "Hagar." In Harold Bloom. American Religious Poems, page 379. Library of America, 2006.
Suzanne A. Brody. "Lishma" and "Vayera." In Dancing in the White Spaces: The Yearly Torah Cycle and More Poems, pages 32, 65. Shelbyville, Kentucky: Wasteland Press, 2007.
Terence E. Fretheim. Abraham: Trials of Family and Faith. Columbia, South Carolina: University of South Carolina Press, 2007.
Esther Jungreis. Life Is a Test, pages 19, 21, 27–29, 134, 214–15. Brooklyn: Shaar Press, 2007.
James L. Kugel. How To Read the Bible: A Guide to Scripture, Then and Now, pages 11–14, 21, 30, 39, 60, 100–01, 103, 107–32, 278, 390, 413, 421. New York: Free Press, 2007.
James C. Okoye. “Sarah and Hagar: Genesis 16 and 21.” Journal for the Study of the Old Testament, volume 32 (number 2) (December 2007): pages 163–75.
Pharaoh's Daughter. "Hagar." In Haran. Oyhoo Records, 2007.
Jeff Pinkner and Brian K. Vaughan. "Catch-22." In Lost. New York: American Broadcasting Company, 2007. (binding of Isaac plot element).
Walter Brueggemann. Great Prayers of the Old Testament, pages 1–10. Louisville, Kentucky: Westminster John Knox Press, 2008. (prayer of ).
Mary Mills. "The Story of Abraham and Models of Human Identity." New Blackfriars, volume 89 (number 1021) (May 2008): pages 280–99.
The Torah: A Women's Commentary. Edited by Tamara Cohn Eskenazi and Andrea L. Weiss, pages 85–110. New York: URJ Press, 2008.
Amos Frumkin. "How Lot's Wife Became a Pillar of Salt." Biblical Archaeology Review, volume 35 (number 3) (May/June 2009): pages 39–44, 64.
Reuven Hammer. Entering Torah: Prefaces to the Weekly Torah Portion, pages 23–28. New York: Gefen Publishing House, 2009.
Timothy Keller. "All You've Ever Wanted." In Counterfeit Gods: The Empty Promises of Money, Sex, and Power, and the Only Hope that Matters. Dutton Adult, 2009. (binding of Isaac).
Gwynn Kessler. "Looking Back to Look Forward: Parashat Vayera (Genesis 18:1–22:24)." In Torah Queeries: Weekly Commentaries on the Hebrew Bible. Edited by Gregg Drinkwater, Joshua Lesser, and David Shneer; foreword by Judith Plaskow, pages 29–33. New York: New York University Press, 2009.
D.A. Powell. "bound isaac"  In Chronic: Poems, pages 58–59. Saint Paul: First Graywolf Printing, 2009.

Jonathan Sacks. Covenant & Conversation: A Weekly Reading of the Jewish Bible: Genesis: The Book of Beginnings, pages 95–119. New Milford, Connecticut: Maggid Books, 2009.
Carolyn J. Sharp. "Pharaoh and Abimelech as Innocents Ensnared." In Irony and Meaning in the Hebrew Bible, pages 51–54. Bloomington, Indiana: Indiana University Press, 2009.
John H. Walton. "Genesis." In Zondervan Illustrated Bible Backgrounds Commentary. Edited by John H. Walton, volume 1, pages 90–99. Grand Rapids, Michigan: Zondervan, 2009.
Henrietta L. Wiley. “They Save Themselves Alone: Faith and Loss in the Stories of Abraham and Job.” Journal for the Study of the Old Testament, volume 34 (number 2) (December 2009): pages 115–29.
Jonathan Jacobs. "Willing Obedience with Doubts: Abraham at the Binding of Isaac." Vetus Testamentum, volume 60 (number 4) (2010): pages 546–59.
Andrew J. Schmutzer. “Did the Gods Cause Abraham’s Wandering?
Brad Embry. “The ‘Naked Narrative’ from Noah to Leviticus: Reassessing Voyeurism in the Account of Noah’s Nakedness in Genesis 9.22–24.”  Journal for the Study of the Old Testament, volume 35 (number 4) (June 2011): pages 417–33..
Calum Carmichael. The Book of Numbers: A Critique of Genesis, pages 11, 18, 73, 159. New Haven: Yale University Press, 2012.
William G. Dever. The Lives of Ordinary People in Ancient Israel: When Archaeology and the Bible Intersect, page 44. Grand Rapids, Michigan: William B. Eerdmans Publishing Company, 2012.

Shmuel Herzfeld. "How To Increase Your Love of Hashem." In Fifty-Four Pick Up: Fifteen-Minute Inspirational Torah Lessons, pages 18–23. Jerusalem: Gefen Publishing House, 2012.
James L. Kugel. “Early Jewish Biblical Interpretation.” In John J. Collins and Daniel C. Harlow, editors, Early Judaism: A Comprehensive Overview, pages 166–73. Grand Rapids, Michigan: Wm. B. Eerdmans Publishing, 2012. (early Jewish interpretation of ).
Jon D. Levenson. Inheriting Abraham: The Legacy of the Patriarch in Judaism, Christianity, and Islam. Princeton, New Jersey: Princeton University Press, 2012.
Steven Collins. "Where Is Sodom? The Case for Tall el-Hammam." Biblical Archaeology Review, volume 39 (number 2) (March/April 2013): pages 32–41, 70–71.
Shmuel Klitsner. "Reaction to catastrophe: Doing the unthinkable in order to assure continuity." The Jerusalem Report, volume 25 (number 16) (November 17, 2014): page 47.
Richard Faussette. "The Biblical Significance of Sodom and Gomorrah." (2015).
Jonathan Sacks. Lessons in Leadership: A Weekly Reading of the Jewish Bible, pages 19–22. New Milford, Connecticut: Maggid Books, 2015.
Edward Bridge. "An Audacious Request: Abraham's Dialogue with God in Genesis 18." Journal for the Study of the Old Testament, volume 40 (number 3) (March 2016): pages 281–96.
Jean-Pierre Isbouts. Archaeology of the Bible: The Greatest Discoveries From Genesis to the Roman Era, pages 51–61. Washington, D.C.: National Geographic, 2016.
Jonathan Sacks. Essays on Ethics: A Weekly Reading of the Jewish Bible, pages 21–26. New Milford, Connecticut: Maggid Books, 2016.
Kenneth Seeskin. Thinking about the Torah: A Philosopher Reads the Bible, pages 51–70. Philadelphia: The Jewish Publication Society, 2016.
Jacob Bacharach. The Doorposts of Your House and on Your Gates. New York: Liveright, 2017. (novel loosely retelling the story of Abraham, Sarah, and Isaac).

Shai Held. The Heart of Torah, Volume 1: Essays on the Weekly Torah Portion: Genesis and Exodus, pages 31–39. Philadelphia: Jewish Publication Society, 2017.
Steven Levy and Sarah Levy. The JPS Rashi Discussion Torah Commentary, pages 12–14. Philadelphia: Jewish Publication Society, 2017.
Jeffrey K. Salkin. The JPS B'nai Mitzvah Torah Commentary, pages 16–21. Philadelphia: Jewish Publication Society, 2017.
John J. Collins. Introduction to the Hebrew Bible and Deutero-canonical Books. 3rd ed., pages 95–100. Minneapolis: Fortress, 2018.
Liana Finck. Let There Be Light: The Real Story of Her Creation, pages 190–208. New York: Random House, 2022.

External links

Texts
Masoretic text and 1917 JPS translation
Hear the parashah chanted 
Hear the parashah read in Hebrew

Commentaries

Academy for Jewish Religion, California
Academy for Jewish Religion, New York
Aish.com
Akhlah: The Jewish Children's Learning Network
Aleph Beta Academy
Alicia Jo Rabins
American Jewish University — Ziegler School of Rabbinic Studies
Anshe Emes Synagogue, Los Angeles 
Ari Goldwag
Ascent of Safed
Bar-Ilan University 
Bible Odyssey
Chabad.org
eparsha.com
G-dcast
The Israel Koschitzky Virtual Beit Midrash
Jewish Agency for Israel
Jewish Theological Seminary
Kabbala Online
Krista Tippett on Being
Mechon Hadar
Miriam Aflalo 
MyJewishLearning.com
Ohr Sameach
Orthodox Union
OzTorah, Torah from Australia
Oz Ve Shalom — Netivot Shalom
Pardes from Jerusalem
Professor James L. Kugel
Rabbi Dov Linzer
Rabbi Fabian Werbin
Rabbi Jonathan Sacks
RabbiShimon.com 
Rabbi Shlomo Riskin
Rabbi Shmuel Herzfeld
Rabbi Stan Levin 
Reconstructionist Judaism 
Sephardic Institute
Shiur.com
613.org Jewish Torah Audio
Tanach Study Center
Teach613.org, Torah Education at Cherry Hill
TheTorah.com
Torah from Dixie 
Torah.org
TorahVort.com
Union for Reform Judaism
United Synagogue of Conservative Judaism
What's Bothering Rashi?
Yeshivat Chovevei Torah
Yeshiva University

 
Abraham
Weekly Torah readings from Genesis
Rosh Hashanah
Weekly Torah readings in Cheshvan